

49001–49100 

|-bgcolor=#fefefe
| 49001 ||  || — || August 27, 1998 || Anderson Mesa || LONEOS || — || align=right | 3.7 km || 
|-id=002 bgcolor=#fefefe
| 49002 ||  || — || August 30, 1998 || Kitt Peak || Spacewatch || — || align=right | 3.1 km || 
|-id=003 bgcolor=#fefefe
| 49003 ||  || — || August 30, 1998 || Kitt Peak || Spacewatch || MAS || align=right | 2.2 km || 
|-id=004 bgcolor=#fefefe
| 49004 ||  || — || August 26, 1998 || Anderson Mesa || LONEOS || V || align=right | 2.7 km || 
|-id=005 bgcolor=#fefefe
| 49005 ||  || — || August 27, 1998 || Xinglong || SCAP || — || align=right | 2.3 km || 
|-id=006 bgcolor=#E9E9E9
| 49006 ||  || — || August 31, 1998 || Bergisch Gladbach || W. Bickel || — || align=right | 2.2 km || 
|-id=007 bgcolor=#E9E9E9
| 49007 ||  || — || August 24, 1998 || Socorro || LINEAR || — || align=right | 6.3 km || 
|-id=008 bgcolor=#fefefe
| 49008 ||  || — || August 24, 1998 || Socorro || LINEAR || — || align=right | 2.7 km || 
|-id=009 bgcolor=#fefefe
| 49009 ||  || — || August 24, 1998 || Socorro || LINEAR || V || align=right | 2.7 km || 
|-id=010 bgcolor=#E9E9E9
| 49010 ||  || — || August 24, 1998 || Socorro || LINEAR || — || align=right | 2.8 km || 
|-id=011 bgcolor=#E9E9E9
| 49011 ||  || — || August 24, 1998 || Socorro || LINEAR || — || align=right | 2.8 km || 
|-id=012 bgcolor=#fefefe
| 49012 ||  || — || August 24, 1998 || Socorro || LINEAR || V || align=right | 2.7 km || 
|-id=013 bgcolor=#E9E9E9
| 49013 ||  || — || August 24, 1998 || Socorro || LINEAR || — || align=right | 5.9 km || 
|-id=014 bgcolor=#fefefe
| 49014 ||  || — || August 24, 1998 || Socorro || LINEAR || — || align=right | 5.1 km || 
|-id=015 bgcolor=#fefefe
| 49015 ||  || — || August 24, 1998 || Socorro || LINEAR || V || align=right | 1.7 km || 
|-id=016 bgcolor=#fefefe
| 49016 ||  || — || August 24, 1998 || Socorro || LINEAR || — || align=right | 5.5 km || 
|-id=017 bgcolor=#fefefe
| 49017 ||  || — || August 24, 1998 || Socorro || LINEAR || — || align=right | 2.2 km || 
|-id=018 bgcolor=#fefefe
| 49018 ||  || — || August 24, 1998 || Socorro || LINEAR || V || align=right | 1.8 km || 
|-id=019 bgcolor=#E9E9E9
| 49019 ||  || — || August 24, 1998 || Socorro || LINEAR || MAR || align=right | 4.6 km || 
|-id=020 bgcolor=#fefefe
| 49020 ||  || — || August 24, 1998 || Socorro || LINEAR || — || align=right | 2.3 km || 
|-id=021 bgcolor=#E9E9E9
| 49021 ||  || — || August 24, 1998 || Socorro || LINEAR || — || align=right | 3.4 km || 
|-id=022 bgcolor=#fefefe
| 49022 ||  || — || August 28, 1998 || Socorro || LINEAR || NYS || align=right | 2.7 km || 
|-id=023 bgcolor=#E9E9E9
| 49023 ||  || — || August 28, 1998 || Socorro || LINEAR || — || align=right | 5.9 km || 
|-id=024 bgcolor=#fefefe
| 49024 ||  || — || August 19, 1998 || Socorro || LINEAR || — || align=right | 6.5 km || 
|-id=025 bgcolor=#fefefe
| 49025 ||  || — || August 19, 1998 || Socorro || LINEAR || — || align=right | 1.6 km || 
|-id=026 bgcolor=#fefefe
| 49026 ||  || — || August 26, 1998 || La Silla || E. W. Elst || — || align=right | 2.0 km || 
|-id=027 bgcolor=#fefefe
| 49027 ||  || — || August 26, 1998 || La Silla || E. W. Elst || — || align=right | 2.9 km || 
|-id=028 bgcolor=#fefefe
| 49028 ||  || — || August 26, 1998 || La Silla || E. W. Elst || — || align=right | 2.9 km || 
|-id=029 bgcolor=#fefefe
| 49029 ||  || — || August 26, 1998 || La Silla || E. W. Elst || NYS || align=right | 2.5 km || 
|-id=030 bgcolor=#fefefe
| 49030 ||  || — || August 26, 1998 || La Silla || E. W. Elst || FLO || align=right | 2.0 km || 
|-id=031 bgcolor=#fefefe
| 49031 ||  || — || August 26, 1998 || La Silla || E. W. Elst || — || align=right | 2.9 km || 
|-id=032 bgcolor=#fefefe
| 49032 ||  || — || August 26, 1998 || La Silla || E. W. Elst || V || align=right | 2.0 km || 
|-id=033 bgcolor=#fefefe
| 49033 ||  || — || August 25, 1998 || La Silla || E. W. Elst || — || align=right | 2.7 km || 
|-id=034 bgcolor=#E9E9E9
| 49034 ||  || — || August 25, 1998 || La Silla || E. W. Elst || — || align=right | 2.3 km || 
|-id=035 bgcolor=#fefefe
| 49035 ||  || — || August 25, 1998 || La Silla || E. W. Elst || — || align=right | 2.1 km || 
|-id=036 bgcolor=#C7FF8F
| 49036 Pelion ||  ||  || August 21, 1998 || Mauna Kea || R. J. Whiteley, D. J. Tholen || centaurcritical || align=right | 37 km || 
|-id=037 bgcolor=#fefefe
| 49037 ||  || — || August 17, 1998 || Socorro || LINEAR || NYS || align=right | 1.9 km || 
|-id=038 bgcolor=#fefefe
| 49038 ||  || — || August 23, 1998 || Socorro || LINEAR || — || align=right | 2.5 km || 
|-id=039 bgcolor=#fefefe
| 49039 || 1998 RH || — || September 1, 1998 || Woomera || F. B. Zoltowski || V || align=right | 3.1 km || 
|-id=040 bgcolor=#fefefe
| 49040 || 1998 RO || — || September 9, 1998 || Caussols || ODAS || — || align=right | 2.0 km || 
|-id=041 bgcolor=#fefefe
| 49041 || 1998 RW || — || September 12, 1998 || Oizumi || T. Kobayashi || V || align=right | 1.6 km || 
|-id=042 bgcolor=#fefefe
| 49042 ||  || — || September 12, 1998 || Woomera || F. B. Zoltowski || NYS || align=right | 3.3 km || 
|-id=043 bgcolor=#fefefe
| 49043 ||  || — || September 14, 1998 || Socorro || LINEAR || PHO || align=right | 3.4 km || 
|-id=044 bgcolor=#fefefe
| 49044 ||  || — || September 15, 1998 || Kitt Peak || Spacewatch || MAS || align=right | 2.2 km || 
|-id=045 bgcolor=#fefefe
| 49045 ||  || — || September 14, 1998 || Socorro || LINEAR || NYS || align=right | 1.4 km || 
|-id=046 bgcolor=#fefefe
| 49046 ||  || — || September 14, 1998 || Socorro || LINEAR || NYS || align=right | 2.3 km || 
|-id=047 bgcolor=#fefefe
| 49047 ||  || — || September 14, 1998 || Socorro || LINEAR || V || align=right | 1.3 km || 
|-id=048 bgcolor=#fefefe
| 49048 ||  || — || September 15, 1998 || Kitt Peak || Spacewatch || FLO || align=right | 2.6 km || 
|-id=049 bgcolor=#fefefe
| 49049 ||  || — || September 14, 1998 || Socorro || LINEAR || — || align=right | 1.7 km || 
|-id=050 bgcolor=#fefefe
| 49050 ||  || — || September 14, 1998 || Socorro || LINEAR || — || align=right | 1.7 km || 
|-id=051 bgcolor=#fefefe
| 49051 ||  || — || September 14, 1998 || Socorro || LINEAR || V || align=right | 1.8 km || 
|-id=052 bgcolor=#E9E9E9
| 49052 ||  || — || September 14, 1998 || Socorro || LINEAR || — || align=right | 3.8 km || 
|-id=053 bgcolor=#fefefe
| 49053 ||  || — || September 14, 1998 || Socorro || LINEAR || FLO || align=right | 4.9 km || 
|-id=054 bgcolor=#fefefe
| 49054 ||  || — || September 14, 1998 || Socorro || LINEAR || — || align=right | 5.1 km || 
|-id=055 bgcolor=#fefefe
| 49055 ||  || — || September 14, 1998 || Socorro || LINEAR || NYS || align=right | 2.0 km || 
|-id=056 bgcolor=#fefefe
| 49056 ||  || — || September 14, 1998 || Socorro || LINEAR || — || align=right | 2.3 km || 
|-id=057 bgcolor=#E9E9E9
| 49057 ||  || — || September 14, 1998 || Socorro || LINEAR || EUN || align=right | 2.9 km || 
|-id=058 bgcolor=#fefefe
| 49058 ||  || — || September 14, 1998 || Socorro || LINEAR || — || align=right | 2.9 km || 
|-id=059 bgcolor=#fefefe
| 49059 ||  || — || September 14, 1998 || Socorro || LINEAR || — || align=right | 3.2 km || 
|-id=060 bgcolor=#E9E9E9
| 49060 ||  || — || September 14, 1998 || Socorro || LINEAR || DOR || align=right | 6.3 km || 
|-id=061 bgcolor=#fefefe
| 49061 ||  || — || September 14, 1998 || Socorro || LINEAR || V || align=right | 1.9 km || 
|-id=062 bgcolor=#fefefe
| 49062 ||  || — || September 14, 1998 || Socorro || LINEAR || V || align=right | 1.8 km || 
|-id=063 bgcolor=#E9E9E9
| 49063 ||  || — || September 14, 1998 || Socorro || LINEAR || — || align=right | 2.6 km || 
|-id=064 bgcolor=#fefefe
| 49064 ||  || — || September 14, 1998 || Socorro || LINEAR || — || align=right | 2.3 km || 
|-id=065 bgcolor=#E9E9E9
| 49065 ||  || — || September 14, 1998 || Socorro || LINEAR || — || align=right | 2.8 km || 
|-id=066 bgcolor=#E9E9E9
| 49066 ||  || — || September 14, 1998 || Socorro || LINEAR || — || align=right | 2.6 km || 
|-id=067 bgcolor=#fefefe
| 49067 ||  || — || September 14, 1998 || Socorro || LINEAR || — || align=right | 2.5 km || 
|-id=068 bgcolor=#E9E9E9
| 49068 ||  || — || September 14, 1998 || Socorro || LINEAR || — || align=right | 3.0 km || 
|-id=069 bgcolor=#fefefe
| 49069 ||  || — || September 14, 1998 || Socorro || LINEAR || — || align=right | 1.9 km || 
|-id=070 bgcolor=#fefefe
| 49070 ||  || — || September 14, 1998 || Socorro || LINEAR || V || align=right | 1.8 km || 
|-id=071 bgcolor=#fefefe
| 49071 ||  || — || September 14, 1998 || Socorro || LINEAR || V || align=right | 2.4 km || 
|-id=072 bgcolor=#fefefe
| 49072 ||  || — || September 14, 1998 || Socorro || LINEAR || — || align=right | 2.8 km || 
|-id=073 bgcolor=#fefefe
| 49073 ||  || — || September 14, 1998 || Socorro || LINEAR || NYS || align=right | 1.7 km || 
|-id=074 bgcolor=#fefefe
| 49074 ||  || — || September 14, 1998 || Socorro || LINEAR || — || align=right | 2.2 km || 
|-id=075 bgcolor=#fefefe
| 49075 ||  || — || September 14, 1998 || Socorro || LINEAR || — || align=right | 1.8 km || 
|-id=076 bgcolor=#E9E9E9
| 49076 ||  || — || September 14, 1998 || Socorro || LINEAR || — || align=right | 2.0 km || 
|-id=077 bgcolor=#fefefe
| 49077 ||  || — || September 14, 1998 || Socorro || LINEAR || — || align=right | 2.1 km || 
|-id=078 bgcolor=#fefefe
| 49078 ||  || — || September 14, 1998 || Socorro || LINEAR || V || align=right | 2.1 km || 
|-id=079 bgcolor=#E9E9E9
| 49079 ||  || — || September 14, 1998 || Socorro || LINEAR || — || align=right | 2.5 km || 
|-id=080 bgcolor=#fefefe
| 49080 ||  || — || September 14, 1998 || Socorro || LINEAR || — || align=right | 2.8 km || 
|-id=081 bgcolor=#fefefe
| 49081 ||  || — || September 14, 1998 || Socorro || LINEAR || NYS || align=right | 9.8 km || 
|-id=082 bgcolor=#E9E9E9
| 49082 ||  || — || September 14, 1998 || Socorro || LINEAR || — || align=right | 8.2 km || 
|-id=083 bgcolor=#E9E9E9
| 49083 ||  || — || September 14, 1998 || Socorro || LINEAR || MAR || align=right | 3.4 km || 
|-id=084 bgcolor=#fefefe
| 49084 ||  || — || September 14, 1998 || Socorro || LINEAR || NYS || align=right | 1.7 km || 
|-id=085 bgcolor=#fefefe
| 49085 ||  || — || September 14, 1998 || Socorro || LINEAR || V || align=right | 2.3 km || 
|-id=086 bgcolor=#E9E9E9
| 49086 ||  || — || September 14, 1998 || Socorro || LINEAR || — || align=right | 4.3 km || 
|-id=087 bgcolor=#fefefe
| 49087 ||  || — || September 14, 1998 || Socorro || LINEAR || — || align=right | 2.7 km || 
|-id=088 bgcolor=#fefefe
| 49088 ||  || — || September 14, 1998 || Socorro || LINEAR || — || align=right | 4.3 km || 
|-id=089 bgcolor=#fefefe
| 49089 ||  || — || September 14, 1998 || Socorro || LINEAR || NYS || align=right | 1.7 km || 
|-id=090 bgcolor=#fefefe
| 49090 ||  || — || September 14, 1998 || Socorro || LINEAR || NYS || align=right | 2.2 km || 
|-id=091 bgcolor=#fefefe
| 49091 ||  || — || September 14, 1998 || Socorro || LINEAR || — || align=right | 2.8 km || 
|-id=092 bgcolor=#fefefe
| 49092 ||  || — || September 14, 1998 || Socorro || LINEAR || — || align=right | 2.8 km || 
|-id=093 bgcolor=#E9E9E9
| 49093 ||  || — || September 14, 1998 || Socorro || LINEAR || — || align=right | 7.1 km || 
|-id=094 bgcolor=#fefefe
| 49094 ||  || — || September 14, 1998 || Socorro || LINEAR || NYS || align=right | 1.3 km || 
|-id=095 bgcolor=#fefefe
| 49095 ||  || — || September 14, 1998 || Socorro || LINEAR || NYS || align=right | 2.7 km || 
|-id=096 bgcolor=#E9E9E9
| 49096 ||  || — || September 14, 1998 || Socorro || LINEAR || — || align=right | 3.9 km || 
|-id=097 bgcolor=#fefefe
| 49097 ||  || — || September 14, 1998 || Socorro || LINEAR || — || align=right | 2.1 km || 
|-id=098 bgcolor=#E9E9E9
| 49098 ||  || — || September 14, 1998 || Socorro || LINEAR || — || align=right | 5.9 km || 
|-id=099 bgcolor=#E9E9E9
| 49099 ||  || — || September 14, 1998 || Socorro || LINEAR || — || align=right | 7.4 km || 
|-id=100 bgcolor=#fefefe
| 49100 ||  || — || September 14, 1998 || Socorro || LINEAR || NYS || align=right | 7.9 km || 
|}

49101–49200 

|-bgcolor=#fefefe
| 49101 ||  || — || September 14, 1998 || Socorro || LINEAR || V || align=right | 2.4 km || 
|-id=102 bgcolor=#fefefe
| 49102 ||  || — || September 14, 1998 || Socorro || LINEAR || NYS || align=right | 1.8 km || 
|-id=103 bgcolor=#fefefe
| 49103 ||  || — || September 14, 1998 || Socorro || LINEAR || NYS || align=right | 1.9 km || 
|-id=104 bgcolor=#fefefe
| 49104 ||  || — || September 14, 1998 || Socorro || LINEAR || — || align=right | 2.6 km || 
|-id=105 bgcolor=#fefefe
| 49105 ||  || — || September 14, 1998 || Socorro || LINEAR || NYS || align=right | 2.0 km || 
|-id=106 bgcolor=#E9E9E9
| 49106 || 1998 SY || — || September 16, 1998 || Caussols || ODAS || — || align=right | 3.9 km || 
|-id=107 bgcolor=#E9E9E9
| 49107 ||  || — || September 16, 1998 || Caussols || ODAS || — || align=right | 2.0 km || 
|-id=108 bgcolor=#E9E9E9
| 49108 ||  || — || September 16, 1998 || Caussols || ODAS || — || align=right | 3.3 km || 
|-id=109 bgcolor=#E9E9E9
| 49109 Agnesraab ||  ||  || September 18, 1998 || Lime Creek || R. Linderholm || EUN || align=right | 3.0 km || 
|-id=110 bgcolor=#E9E9E9
| 49110 Květafialová ||  ||  || September 16, 1998 || Ondřejov || P. Pravec, L. Kotková || — || align=right | 3.9 km || 
|-id=111 bgcolor=#fefefe
| 49111 ||  || — || September 20, 1998 || Kitt Peak || Spacewatch || — || align=right | 2.5 km || 
|-id=112 bgcolor=#fefefe
| 49112 ||  || — || September 20, 1998 || Kitt Peak || Spacewatch || — || align=right | 1.8 km || 
|-id=113 bgcolor=#fefefe
| 49113 ||  || — || September 20, 1998 || Kitt Peak || Spacewatch || NYS || align=right | 1.6 km || 
|-id=114 bgcolor=#fefefe
| 49114 ||  || — || September 20, 1998 || Kitt Peak || Spacewatch || NYS || align=right | 2.2 km || 
|-id=115 bgcolor=#E9E9E9
| 49115 ||  || — || September 17, 1998 || Xinglong || SCAP || — || align=right | 2.0 km || 
|-id=116 bgcolor=#E9E9E9
| 49116 ||  || — || September 18, 1998 || Višnjan Observatory || Višnjan Obs. || — || align=right | 2.6 km || 
|-id=117 bgcolor=#E9E9E9
| 49117 ||  || — || September 16, 1998 || Caussols || ODAS || GEF || align=right | 4.7 km || 
|-id=118 bgcolor=#E9E9E9
| 49118 ||  || — || September 19, 1998 || Caussols || ODAS || — || align=right | 5.5 km || 
|-id=119 bgcolor=#fefefe
| 49119 ||  || — || September 19, 1998 || Caussols || ODAS || V || align=right | 1.7 km || 
|-id=120 bgcolor=#fefefe
| 49120 ||  || — || September 17, 1998 || Višnjan Observatory || Višnjan Obs. || NYS || align=right | 2.2 km || 
|-id=121 bgcolor=#fefefe
| 49121 ||  || — || September 17, 1998 || Anderson Mesa || LONEOS || — || align=right | 2.2 km || 
|-id=122 bgcolor=#fefefe
| 49122 ||  || — || September 17, 1998 || Anderson Mesa || LONEOS || — || align=right | 2.4 km || 
|-id=123 bgcolor=#fefefe
| 49123 ||  || — || September 17, 1998 || Kitt Peak || Spacewatch || — || align=right | 3.2 km || 
|-id=124 bgcolor=#fefefe
| 49124 ||  || — || September 17, 1998 || Kitt Peak || Spacewatch || MAS || align=right | 1.7 km || 
|-id=125 bgcolor=#fefefe
| 49125 ||  || — || September 23, 1998 || Višnjan Observatory || Višnjan Obs. || — || align=right | 2.6 km || 
|-id=126 bgcolor=#fefefe
| 49126 ||  || — || September 23, 1998 || Višnjan Observatory || Višnjan Obs. || FLO || align=right | 1.5 km || 
|-id=127 bgcolor=#E9E9E9
| 49127 ||  || — || September 24, 1998 || Višnjan Observatory || Višnjan Obs. || EUN || align=right | 3.4 km || 
|-id=128 bgcolor=#E9E9E9
| 49128 ||  || — || September 17, 1998 || Anderson Mesa || LONEOS || — || align=right | 2.5 km || 
|-id=129 bgcolor=#fefefe
| 49129 ||  || — || September 17, 1998 || Anderson Mesa || LONEOS || V || align=right | 2.3 km || 
|-id=130 bgcolor=#E9E9E9
| 49130 ||  || — || September 17, 1998 || Anderson Mesa || LONEOS || — || align=right | 2.6 km || 
|-id=131 bgcolor=#E9E9E9
| 49131 ||  || — || September 17, 1998 || Anderson Mesa || LONEOS || — || align=right | 2.9 km || 
|-id=132 bgcolor=#fefefe
| 49132 ||  || — || September 17, 1998 || Anderson Mesa || LONEOS || — || align=right | 3.0 km || 
|-id=133 bgcolor=#fefefe
| 49133 ||  || — || September 19, 1998 || Anderson Mesa || LONEOS || FLO || align=right | 2.7 km || 
|-id=134 bgcolor=#fefefe
| 49134 ||  || — || September 18, 1998 || Višnjan Observatory || Višnjan Obs. || MAS || align=right | 2.6 km || 
|-id=135 bgcolor=#E9E9E9
| 49135 ||  || — || September 17, 1998 || Kitt Peak || Spacewatch || — || align=right | 5.9 km || 
|-id=136 bgcolor=#E9E9E9
| 49136 ||  || — || September 26, 1998 || Socorro || LINEAR || JUN || align=right | 2.4 km || 
|-id=137 bgcolor=#E9E9E9
| 49137 ||  || — || September 26, 1998 || Socorro || LINEAR || — || align=right | 5.7 km || 
|-id=138 bgcolor=#fefefe
| 49138 ||  || — || September 20, 1998 || Kitt Peak || Spacewatch || — || align=right | 2.3 km || 
|-id=139 bgcolor=#fefefe
| 49139 ||  || — || September 21, 1998 || Kitt Peak || Spacewatch || — || align=right | 3.1 km || 
|-id=140 bgcolor=#fefefe
| 49140 ||  || — || September 25, 1998 || Kitt Peak || Spacewatch || — || align=right | 2.1 km || 
|-id=141 bgcolor=#fefefe
| 49141 ||  || — || September 25, 1998 || Kitt Peak || Spacewatch || — || align=right | 3.5 km || 
|-id=142 bgcolor=#fefefe
| 49142 ||  || — || September 23, 1998 || Farra d'Isonzo || Farra d'Isonzo || — || align=right | 1.8 km || 
|-id=143 bgcolor=#fefefe
| 49143 ||  || — || September 23, 1998 || Xinglong || SCAP || — || align=right | 2.6 km || 
|-id=144 bgcolor=#fefefe
| 49144 ||  || — || September 25, 1998 || Kitt Peak || Spacewatch || — || align=right | 2.1 km || 
|-id=145 bgcolor=#fefefe
| 49145 ||  || — || September 25, 1998 || Kitt Peak || Spacewatch || — || align=right | 2.4 km || 
|-id=146 bgcolor=#E9E9E9
| 49146 ||  || — || September 27, 1998 || Kitt Peak || Spacewatch || — || align=right | 5.6 km || 
|-id=147 bgcolor=#E9E9E9
| 49147 ||  || — || September 27, 1998 || Kitt Peak || Spacewatch || — || align=right | 3.1 km || 
|-id=148 bgcolor=#fefefe
| 49148 ||  || — || September 23, 1998 || Višnjan Observatory || Višnjan Obs. || — || align=right | 1.8 km || 
|-id=149 bgcolor=#fefefe
| 49149 ||  || — || September 24, 1998 || Višnjan Observatory || Višnjan Obs. || NYS || align=right | 1.7 km || 
|-id=150 bgcolor=#fefefe
| 49150 ||  || — || September 26, 1998 || Kitt Peak || Spacewatch || ERI || align=right | 5.5 km || 
|-id=151 bgcolor=#E9E9E9
| 49151 ||  || — || September 27, 1998 || Kitt Peak || Spacewatch || — || align=right | 2.6 km || 
|-id=152 bgcolor=#fefefe
| 49152 ||  || — || September 29, 1998 || Kitt Peak || Spacewatch || — || align=right | 3.1 km || 
|-id=153 bgcolor=#E9E9E9
| 49153 ||  || — || September 30, 1998 || Kitt Peak || Spacewatch || — || align=right | 2.9 km || 
|-id=154 bgcolor=#fefefe
| 49154 ||  || — || September 16, 1998 || Anderson Mesa || LONEOS || — || align=right | 2.1 km || 
|-id=155 bgcolor=#fefefe
| 49155 ||  || — || September 16, 1998 || Anderson Mesa || LONEOS || — || align=right | 4.2 km || 
|-id=156 bgcolor=#fefefe
| 49156 ||  || — || September 16, 1998 || Anderson Mesa || LONEOS || V || align=right | 3.9 km || 
|-id=157 bgcolor=#fefefe
| 49157 ||  || — || September 16, 1998 || Anderson Mesa || LONEOS || NYS || align=right | 2.1 km || 
|-id=158 bgcolor=#fefefe
| 49158 ||  || — || September 16, 1998 || Anderson Mesa || LONEOS || NYS || align=right | 1.9 km || 
|-id=159 bgcolor=#fefefe
| 49159 ||  || — || September 16, 1998 || Anderson Mesa || LONEOS || NYS || align=right | 1.5 km || 
|-id=160 bgcolor=#fefefe
| 49160 ||  || — || September 16, 1998 || Anderson Mesa || LONEOS || — || align=right | 2.1 km || 
|-id=161 bgcolor=#E9E9E9
| 49161 ||  || — || September 16, 1998 || Anderson Mesa || LONEOS || — || align=right | 5.3 km || 
|-id=162 bgcolor=#fefefe
| 49162 ||  || — || September 16, 1998 || Anderson Mesa || LONEOS || NYS || align=right | 1.9 km || 
|-id=163 bgcolor=#fefefe
| 49163 ||  || — || September 17, 1998 || Anderson Mesa || LONEOS || — || align=right | 2.4 km || 
|-id=164 bgcolor=#fefefe
| 49164 ||  || — || September 17, 1998 || Anderson Mesa || LONEOS || NYS || align=right | 3.6 km || 
|-id=165 bgcolor=#fefefe
| 49165 ||  || — || September 17, 1998 || Anderson Mesa || LONEOS || — || align=right | 2.5 km || 
|-id=166 bgcolor=#fefefe
| 49166 ||  || — || September 17, 1998 || Anderson Mesa || LONEOS || FLO || align=right | 3.5 km || 
|-id=167 bgcolor=#fefefe
| 49167 ||  || — || September 17, 1998 || Anderson Mesa || LONEOS || — || align=right | 1.9 km || 
|-id=168 bgcolor=#fefefe
| 49168 ||  || — || September 17, 1998 || Anderson Mesa || LONEOS || — || align=right | 1.8 km || 
|-id=169 bgcolor=#fefefe
| 49169 ||  || — || September 17, 1998 || Anderson Mesa || LONEOS || MAS || align=right | 2.0 km || 
|-id=170 bgcolor=#fefefe
| 49170 ||  || — || September 17, 1998 || Anderson Mesa || LONEOS || — || align=right | 2.9 km || 
|-id=171 bgcolor=#fefefe
| 49171 ||  || — || September 17, 1998 || Anderson Mesa || LONEOS || NYS || align=right | 1.9 km || 
|-id=172 bgcolor=#E9E9E9
| 49172 ||  || — || September 17, 1998 || Anderson Mesa || LONEOS || — || align=right | 4.2 km || 
|-id=173 bgcolor=#fefefe
| 49173 ||  || — || September 29, 1998 || Xinglong || SCAP || — || align=right | 2.7 km || 
|-id=174 bgcolor=#fefefe
| 49174 ||  || — || September 20, 1998 || La Silla || E. W. Elst || — || align=right | 3.1 km || 
|-id=175 bgcolor=#fefefe
| 49175 ||  || — || September 20, 1998 || La Silla || E. W. Elst || — || align=right | 2.6 km || 
|-id=176 bgcolor=#E9E9E9
| 49176 ||  || — || September 20, 1998 || La Silla || E. W. Elst || — || align=right | 2.5 km || 
|-id=177 bgcolor=#fefefe
| 49177 ||  || — || September 20, 1998 || La Silla || E. W. Elst || — || align=right | 3.1 km || 
|-id=178 bgcolor=#E9E9E9
| 49178 ||  || — || September 20, 1998 || La Silla || E. W. Elst || — || align=right | 2.2 km || 
|-id=179 bgcolor=#E9E9E9
| 49179 ||  || — || September 20, 1998 || La Silla || E. W. Elst || — || align=right | 2.7 km || 
|-id=180 bgcolor=#fefefe
| 49180 ||  || — || September 20, 1998 || La Silla || E. W. Elst || — || align=right | 3.3 km || 
|-id=181 bgcolor=#E9E9E9
| 49181 ||  || — || September 20, 1998 || La Silla || E. W. Elst || — || align=right | 5.9 km || 
|-id=182 bgcolor=#fefefe
| 49182 ||  || — || September 19, 1998 || Socorro || LINEAR || — || align=right | 2.6 km || 
|-id=183 bgcolor=#fefefe
| 49183 ||  || — || September 21, 1998 || La Silla || E. W. Elst || V || align=right | 2.2 km || 
|-id=184 bgcolor=#fefefe
| 49184 ||  || — || September 21, 1998 || La Silla || E. W. Elst || V || align=right | 2.8 km || 
|-id=185 bgcolor=#E9E9E9
| 49185 ||  || — || September 21, 1998 || La Silla || E. W. Elst || — || align=right | 3.5 km || 
|-id=186 bgcolor=#fefefe
| 49186 ||  || — || September 20, 1998 || Xinglong || SCAP || NYS || align=right | 2.0 km || 
|-id=187 bgcolor=#fefefe
| 49187 Zucchini ||  ||  || September 18, 1998 || Bologna || San Vittore Obs. || — || align=right | 1.5 km || 
|-id=188 bgcolor=#fefefe
| 49188 ||  || — || September 26, 1998 || Socorro || LINEAR || NYS || align=right | 1.7 km || 
|-id=189 bgcolor=#fefefe
| 49189 ||  || — || September 26, 1998 || Socorro || LINEAR || — || align=right | 4.8 km || 
|-id=190 bgcolor=#fefefe
| 49190 ||  || — || September 26, 1998 || Socorro || LINEAR || MAS || align=right | 2.1 km || 
|-id=191 bgcolor=#fefefe
| 49191 ||  || — || September 26, 1998 || Socorro || LINEAR || — || align=right | 2.4 km || 
|-id=192 bgcolor=#E9E9E9
| 49192 ||  || — || September 26, 1998 || Socorro || LINEAR || — || align=right | 1.8 km || 
|-id=193 bgcolor=#fefefe
| 49193 ||  || — || September 26, 1998 || Socorro || LINEAR || — || align=right | 2.3 km || 
|-id=194 bgcolor=#E9E9E9
| 49194 ||  || — || September 26, 1998 || Socorro || LINEAR || — || align=right | 2.7 km || 
|-id=195 bgcolor=#E9E9E9
| 49195 ||  || — || September 26, 1998 || Socorro || LINEAR || — || align=right | 3.8 km || 
|-id=196 bgcolor=#E9E9E9
| 49196 ||  || — || September 26, 1998 || Socorro || LINEAR || — || align=right | 4.3 km || 
|-id=197 bgcolor=#fefefe
| 49197 ||  || — || September 26, 1998 || Socorro || LINEAR || NYS || align=right | 1.9 km || 
|-id=198 bgcolor=#fefefe
| 49198 ||  || — || September 26, 1998 || Socorro || LINEAR || NYS || align=right | 1.5 km || 
|-id=199 bgcolor=#E9E9E9
| 49199 ||  || — || September 26, 1998 || Socorro || LINEAR || — || align=right | 8.2 km || 
|-id=200 bgcolor=#E9E9E9
| 49200 ||  || — || September 26, 1998 || Socorro || LINEAR || — || align=right | 2.3 km || 
|}

49201–49300 

|-bgcolor=#fefefe
| 49201 ||  || — || September 26, 1998 || Socorro || LINEAR || — || align=right | 2.9 km || 
|-id=202 bgcolor=#fefefe
| 49202 ||  || — || September 26, 1998 || Socorro || LINEAR || NYS || align=right | 2.4 km || 
|-id=203 bgcolor=#fefefe
| 49203 ||  || — || September 26, 1998 || Socorro || LINEAR || NYS || align=right | 2.1 km || 
|-id=204 bgcolor=#E9E9E9
| 49204 ||  || — || September 26, 1998 || Socorro || LINEAR || — || align=right | 4.1 km || 
|-id=205 bgcolor=#E9E9E9
| 49205 ||  || — || September 26, 1998 || Socorro || LINEAR || — || align=right | 7.4 km || 
|-id=206 bgcolor=#E9E9E9
| 49206 ||  || — || September 26, 1998 || Socorro || LINEAR || — || align=right | 2.9 km || 
|-id=207 bgcolor=#E9E9E9
| 49207 ||  || — || September 26, 1998 || Socorro || LINEAR || — || align=right | 1.5 km || 
|-id=208 bgcolor=#fefefe
| 49208 ||  || — || September 26, 1998 || Socorro || LINEAR || NYS || align=right | 2.3 km || 
|-id=209 bgcolor=#fefefe
| 49209 ||  || — || September 26, 1998 || Socorro || LINEAR || NYS || align=right | 2.4 km || 
|-id=210 bgcolor=#E9E9E9
| 49210 ||  || — || September 26, 1998 || Socorro || LINEAR || — || align=right | 3.9 km || 
|-id=211 bgcolor=#E9E9E9
| 49211 ||  || — || September 26, 1998 || Socorro || LINEAR || — || align=right | 5.1 km || 
|-id=212 bgcolor=#fefefe
| 49212 ||  || — || September 26, 1998 || Socorro || LINEAR || — || align=right | 2.3 km || 
|-id=213 bgcolor=#fefefe
| 49213 ||  || — || September 26, 1998 || Socorro || LINEAR || MAS || align=right | 2.3 km || 
|-id=214 bgcolor=#fefefe
| 49214 ||  || — || September 26, 1998 || Socorro || LINEAR || — || align=right | 3.1 km || 
|-id=215 bgcolor=#fefefe
| 49215 ||  || — || September 26, 1998 || Socorro || LINEAR || V || align=right | 1.5 km || 
|-id=216 bgcolor=#fefefe
| 49216 ||  || — || September 26, 1998 || Socorro || LINEAR || — || align=right | 2.6 km || 
|-id=217 bgcolor=#fefefe
| 49217 ||  || — || September 26, 1998 || Socorro || LINEAR || — || align=right | 2.3 km || 
|-id=218 bgcolor=#fefefe
| 49218 ||  || — || September 26, 1998 || Socorro || LINEAR || — || align=right | 2.3 km || 
|-id=219 bgcolor=#fefefe
| 49219 ||  || — || September 26, 1998 || Socorro || LINEAR || — || align=right | 2.9 km || 
|-id=220 bgcolor=#E9E9E9
| 49220 ||  || — || September 26, 1998 || Socorro || LINEAR || — || align=right | 6.1 km || 
|-id=221 bgcolor=#E9E9E9
| 49221 ||  || — || September 26, 1998 || Socorro || LINEAR || — || align=right | 3.4 km || 
|-id=222 bgcolor=#fefefe
| 49222 ||  || — || September 26, 1998 || Socorro || LINEAR || NYS || align=right | 2.7 km || 
|-id=223 bgcolor=#fefefe
| 49223 ||  || — || September 26, 1998 || Socorro || LINEAR || — || align=right | 3.4 km || 
|-id=224 bgcolor=#E9E9E9
| 49224 ||  || — || September 26, 1998 || Socorro || LINEAR || — || align=right | 2.7 km || 
|-id=225 bgcolor=#E9E9E9
| 49225 ||  || — || September 26, 1998 || Socorro || LINEAR || — || align=right | 6.4 km || 
|-id=226 bgcolor=#fefefe
| 49226 ||  || — || September 26, 1998 || Socorro || LINEAR || — || align=right | 2.2 km || 
|-id=227 bgcolor=#E9E9E9
| 49227 ||  || — || September 26, 1998 || Socorro || LINEAR || MAR || align=right | 4.8 km || 
|-id=228 bgcolor=#E9E9E9
| 49228 ||  || — || September 26, 1998 || Socorro || LINEAR || — || align=right | 6.8 km || 
|-id=229 bgcolor=#fefefe
| 49229 ||  || — || September 26, 1998 || Socorro || LINEAR || V || align=right | 2.4 km || 
|-id=230 bgcolor=#E9E9E9
| 49230 ||  || — || September 26, 1998 || Socorro || LINEAR || — || align=right | 1.8 km || 
|-id=231 bgcolor=#fefefe
| 49231 ||  || — || September 26, 1998 || Socorro || LINEAR || NYS || align=right | 1.6 km || 
|-id=232 bgcolor=#fefefe
| 49232 ||  || — || September 26, 1998 || Socorro || LINEAR || V || align=right | 2.0 km || 
|-id=233 bgcolor=#E9E9E9
| 49233 ||  || — || September 20, 1998 || La Silla || E. W. Elst || — || align=right | 1.8 km || 
|-id=234 bgcolor=#E9E9E9
| 49234 ||  || — || September 20, 1998 || La Silla || E. W. Elst || — || align=right | 3.4 km || 
|-id=235 bgcolor=#E9E9E9
| 49235 ||  || — || September 20, 1998 || La Silla || E. W. Elst || — || align=right | 5.6 km || 
|-id=236 bgcolor=#fefefe
| 49236 ||  || — || September 26, 1998 || Socorro || LINEAR || NYS || align=right | 1.7 km || 
|-id=237 bgcolor=#fefefe
| 49237 ||  || — || September 26, 1998 || Socorro || LINEAR || — || align=right | 3.2 km || 
|-id=238 bgcolor=#fefefe
| 49238 ||  || — || September 26, 1998 || Socorro || LINEAR || — || align=right | 2.0 km || 
|-id=239 bgcolor=#E9E9E9
| 49239 ||  || — || September 18, 1998 || La Silla || E. W. Elst || — || align=right | 8.4 km || 
|-id=240 bgcolor=#E9E9E9
| 49240 ||  || — || September 18, 1998 || La Silla || E. W. Elst || — || align=right | 3.5 km || 
|-id=241 bgcolor=#fefefe
| 49241 ||  || — || October 14, 1998 || Socorro || LINEAR || — || align=right | 7.1 km || 
|-id=242 bgcolor=#fefefe
| 49242 ||  || — || October 13, 1998 || Višnjan Observatory || K. Korlević || — || align=right | 3.4 km || 
|-id=243 bgcolor=#E9E9E9
| 49243 ||  || — || October 13, 1998 || Višnjan Observatory || K. Korlević || — || align=right | 3.8 km || 
|-id=244 bgcolor=#E9E9E9
| 49244 ||  || — || October 13, 1998 || Višnjan Observatory || K. Korlević || — || align=right | 3.7 km || 
|-id=245 bgcolor=#E9E9E9
| 49245 ||  || — || October 13, 1998 || Višnjan Observatory || K. Korlević || EUN || align=right | 3.9 km || 
|-id=246 bgcolor=#fefefe
| 49246 ||  || — || October 15, 1998 || Višnjan Observatory || K. Korlević || — || align=right | 7.1 km || 
|-id=247 bgcolor=#E9E9E9
| 49247 ||  || — || October 13, 1998 || Ondřejov || L. Kotková || — || align=right | 2.0 km || 
|-id=248 bgcolor=#fefefe
| 49248 ||  || — || October 13, 1998 || Kitt Peak || Spacewatch || MAS || align=right | 1.9 km || 
|-id=249 bgcolor=#E9E9E9
| 49249 ||  || — || October 13, 1998 || Kitt Peak || Spacewatch || — || align=right | 2.2 km || 
|-id=250 bgcolor=#E9E9E9
| 49250 ||  || — || October 14, 1998 || Kitt Peak || Spacewatch || — || align=right | 2.9 km || 
|-id=251 bgcolor=#E9E9E9
| 49251 ||  || — || October 15, 1998 || Višnjan Observatory || K. Korlević || — || align=right | 3.3 km || 
|-id=252 bgcolor=#E9E9E9
| 49252 ||  || — || October 14, 1998 || Xinglong || SCAP || — || align=right | 2.0 km || 
|-id=253 bgcolor=#E9E9E9
| 49253 ||  || — || October 13, 1998 || Kitt Peak || Spacewatch || — || align=right | 6.2 km || 
|-id=254 bgcolor=#E9E9E9
| 49254 ||  || — || October 14, 1998 || Kitt Peak || Spacewatch || — || align=right | 3.2 km || 
|-id=255 bgcolor=#fefefe
| 49255 ||  || — || October 15, 1998 || Kitt Peak || Spacewatch || NYS || align=right | 1.6 km || 
|-id=256 bgcolor=#E9E9E9
| 49256 ||  || — || October 10, 1998 || Anderson Mesa || LONEOS || — || align=right | 5.5 km || 
|-id=257 bgcolor=#E9E9E9
| 49257 ||  || — || October 10, 1998 || Anderson Mesa || LONEOS || — || align=right | 3.1 km || 
|-id=258 bgcolor=#fefefe
| 49258 ||  || — || October 11, 1998 || Anderson Mesa || LONEOS || — || align=right | 3.2 km || 
|-id=259 bgcolor=#fefefe
| 49259 ||  || — || October 14, 1998 || Anderson Mesa || LONEOS || V || align=right | 2.6 km || 
|-id=260 bgcolor=#E9E9E9
| 49260 ||  || — || October 14, 1998 || Anderson Mesa || LONEOS || — || align=right | 2.0 km || 
|-id=261 bgcolor=#E9E9E9
| 49261 ||  || — || October 14, 1998 || Anderson Mesa || LONEOS || — || align=right | 3.3 km || 
|-id=262 bgcolor=#fefefe
| 49262 ||  || — || October 14, 1998 || Anderson Mesa || LONEOS || NYS || align=right | 2.3 km || 
|-id=263 bgcolor=#E9E9E9
| 49263 ||  || — || October 11, 1998 || Anderson Mesa || LONEOS || — || align=right | 4.1 km || 
|-id=264 bgcolor=#fefefe
| 49264 || 1998 UC || — || October 16, 1998 || Catalina || CSS || PHO || align=right | 4.9 km || 
|-id=265 bgcolor=#fefefe
| 49265 ||  || — || October 20, 1998 || Caussols || ODAS || — || align=right | 1.7 km || 
|-id=266 bgcolor=#E9E9E9
| 49266 ||  || — || October 22, 1998 || Caussols || ODAS || — || align=right | 2.1 km || 
|-id=267 bgcolor=#E9E9E9
| 49267 ||  || — || October 18, 1998 || Gekko || T. Kagawa || — || align=right | 4.9 km || 
|-id=268 bgcolor=#E9E9E9
| 49268 ||  || — || October 23, 1998 || Višnjan Observatory || K. Korlević || EUN || align=right | 3.1 km || 
|-id=269 bgcolor=#E9E9E9
| 49269 ||  || — || October 23, 1998 || Višnjan Observatory || K. Korlević || — || align=right | 3.4 km || 
|-id=270 bgcolor=#E9E9E9
| 49270 ||  || — || October 17, 1998 || Xinglong || SCAP || — || align=right | 3.7 km || 
|-id=271 bgcolor=#fefefe
| 49271 ||  || — || October 20, 1998 || Woomera || F. B. Zoltowski || V || align=right | 4.3 km || 
|-id=272 bgcolor=#E9E9E9
| 49272 Bryce Canyon ||  ||  || October 27, 1998 || Goodricke-Pigott || R. A. Tucker || — || align=right | 5.3 km || 
|-id=273 bgcolor=#E9E9E9
| 49273 ||  || — || October 27, 1998 || Višnjan Observatory || K. Korlević || — || align=right | 2.2 km || 
|-id=274 bgcolor=#E9E9E9
| 49274 ||  || — || October 28, 1998 || Višnjan Observatory || K. Korlević || — || align=right | 3.9 km || 
|-id=275 bgcolor=#E9E9E9
| 49275 ||  || — || October 28, 1998 || Višnjan Observatory || K. Korlević || — || align=right | 3.5 km || 
|-id=276 bgcolor=#E9E9E9
| 49276 ||  || — || October 29, 1998 || Višnjan Observatory || K. Korlević || — || align=right | 2.3 km || 
|-id=277 bgcolor=#E9E9E9
| 49277 ||  || — || October 28, 1998 || Socorro || LINEAR || — || align=right | 5.5 km || 
|-id=278 bgcolor=#d6d6d6
| 49278 ||  || — || October 28, 1998 || Socorro || LINEAR || KOR || align=right | 3.5 km || 
|-id=279 bgcolor=#E9E9E9
| 49279 ||  || — || October 28, 1998 || Socorro || LINEAR || — || align=right | 3.2 km || 
|-id=280 bgcolor=#E9E9E9
| 49280 ||  || — || October 28, 1998 || Reedy Creek || J. Broughton || — || align=right | 3.6 km || 
|-id=281 bgcolor=#E9E9E9
| 49281 ||  || — || October 30, 1998 || Višnjan Observatory || K. Korlević || — || align=right | 2.8 km || 
|-id=282 bgcolor=#fefefe
| 49282 ||  || — || October 17, 1998 || Anderson Mesa || LONEOS || — || align=right | 2.5 km || 
|-id=283 bgcolor=#fefefe
| 49283 ||  || — || October 18, 1998 || La Silla || E. W. Elst || — || align=right | 3.4 km || 
|-id=284 bgcolor=#E9E9E9
| 49284 ||  || — || October 18, 1998 || La Silla || E. W. Elst || — || align=right | 3.5 km || 
|-id=285 bgcolor=#E9E9E9
| 49285 ||  || — || October 18, 1998 || La Silla || E. W. Elst || — || align=right | 3.4 km || 
|-id=286 bgcolor=#E9E9E9
| 49286 ||  || — || October 18, 1998 || La Silla || E. W. Elst || — || align=right | 6.2 km || 
|-id=287 bgcolor=#E9E9E9
| 49287 ||  || — || October 22, 1998 || Xinglong || SCAP || — || align=right | 5.6 km || 
|-id=288 bgcolor=#fefefe
| 49288 ||  || — || October 28, 1998 || Socorro || LINEAR || — || align=right | 2.3 km || 
|-id=289 bgcolor=#E9E9E9
| 49289 ||  || — || October 28, 1998 || Socorro || LINEAR || — || align=right | 2.3 km || 
|-id=290 bgcolor=#fefefe
| 49290 ||  || — || October 28, 1998 || Socorro || LINEAR || — || align=right | 4.2 km || 
|-id=291 bgcolor=#E9E9E9
| 49291 Thechills || 1998 VJ ||  || November 8, 1998 || Cocoa || I. P. Griffin || — || align=right | 5.6 km || 
|-id=292 bgcolor=#E9E9E9
| 49292 ||  || — || November 10, 1998 || Socorro || LINEAR || — || align=right | 2.9 km || 
|-id=293 bgcolor=#E9E9E9
| 49293 ||  || — || November 10, 1998 || Socorro || LINEAR || EUN || align=right | 3.0 km || 
|-id=294 bgcolor=#fefefe
| 49294 ||  || — || November 10, 1998 || Caussols || ODAS || — || align=right | 1.6 km || 
|-id=295 bgcolor=#E9E9E9
| 49295 ||  || — || November 10, 1998 || Caussols || ODAS || — || align=right | 2.8 km || 
|-id=296 bgcolor=#E9E9E9
| 49296 ||  || — || November 10, 1998 || Caussols || ODAS || EUN || align=right | 2.7 km || 
|-id=297 bgcolor=#fefefe
| 49297 ||  || — || November 11, 1998 || Zeno || T. Stafford || NYS || align=right | 2.5 km || 
|-id=298 bgcolor=#E9E9E9
| 49298 ||  || — || November 2, 1998 || Fair Oaks Ranch || J. V. McClusky || HNS || align=right | 2.8 km || 
|-id=299 bgcolor=#E9E9E9
| 49299 ||  || — || November 11, 1998 || Gekko || T. Kagawa || — || align=right | 3.6 km || 
|-id=300 bgcolor=#fefefe
| 49300 ||  || — || November 13, 1998 || Farpoint || G. Hug, G. Bell || V || align=right | 2.5 km || 
|}

49301–49400 

|-bgcolor=#E9E9E9
| 49301 ||  || — || November 11, 1998 || Gekko || T. Kagawa || — || align=right | 3.6 km || 
|-id=302 bgcolor=#fefefe
| 49302 ||  || — || November 10, 1998 || Socorro || LINEAR || — || align=right | 4.0 km || 
|-id=303 bgcolor=#E9E9E9
| 49303 ||  || — || November 10, 1998 || Socorro || LINEAR || EUN || align=right | 3.7 km || 
|-id=304 bgcolor=#fefefe
| 49304 ||  || — || November 10, 1998 || Socorro || LINEAR || NYS || align=right | 2.2 km || 
|-id=305 bgcolor=#E9E9E9
| 49305 ||  || — || November 10, 1998 || Socorro || LINEAR || — || align=right | 4.1 km || 
|-id=306 bgcolor=#fefefe
| 49306 ||  || — || November 10, 1998 || Socorro || LINEAR || — || align=right | 2.7 km || 
|-id=307 bgcolor=#E9E9E9
| 49307 ||  || — || November 10, 1998 || Socorro || LINEAR || — || align=right | 5.2 km || 
|-id=308 bgcolor=#E9E9E9
| 49308 ||  || — || November 10, 1998 || Socorro || LINEAR || — || align=right | 3.3 km || 
|-id=309 bgcolor=#fefefe
| 49309 ||  || — || November 10, 1998 || Socorro || LINEAR || NYS || align=right | 2.8 km || 
|-id=310 bgcolor=#E9E9E9
| 49310 ||  || — || November 10, 1998 || Socorro || LINEAR || HNS || align=right | 3.6 km || 
|-id=311 bgcolor=#E9E9E9
| 49311 ||  || — || November 10, 1998 || Socorro || LINEAR || — || align=right | 2.4 km || 
|-id=312 bgcolor=#E9E9E9
| 49312 ||  || — || November 10, 1998 || Socorro || LINEAR || — || align=right | 4.2 km || 
|-id=313 bgcolor=#fefefe
| 49313 ||  || — || November 10, 1998 || Socorro || LINEAR || — || align=right | 9.9 km || 
|-id=314 bgcolor=#fefefe
| 49314 ||  || — || November 10, 1998 || Socorro || LINEAR || — || align=right | 2.7 km || 
|-id=315 bgcolor=#E9E9E9
| 49315 ||  || — || November 10, 1998 || Socorro || LINEAR || — || align=right | 2.2 km || 
|-id=316 bgcolor=#fefefe
| 49316 ||  || — || November 10, 1998 || Socorro || LINEAR || ERI || align=right | 7.4 km || 
|-id=317 bgcolor=#E9E9E9
| 49317 ||  || — || November 10, 1998 || Socorro || LINEAR || EUN || align=right | 5.6 km || 
|-id=318 bgcolor=#E9E9E9
| 49318 ||  || — || November 10, 1998 || Socorro || LINEAR || — || align=right | 2.2 km || 
|-id=319 bgcolor=#E9E9E9
| 49319 ||  || — || November 10, 1998 || Socorro || LINEAR || — || align=right | 5.1 km || 
|-id=320 bgcolor=#fefefe
| 49320 ||  || — || November 10, 1998 || Socorro || LINEAR || NYS || align=right | 2.5 km || 
|-id=321 bgcolor=#E9E9E9
| 49321 ||  || — || November 10, 1998 || Socorro || LINEAR || — || align=right | 2.0 km || 
|-id=322 bgcolor=#E9E9E9
| 49322 ||  || — || November 10, 1998 || Socorro || LINEAR || — || align=right | 3.4 km || 
|-id=323 bgcolor=#fefefe
| 49323 ||  || — || November 10, 1998 || Socorro || LINEAR || — || align=right | 2.6 km || 
|-id=324 bgcolor=#E9E9E9
| 49324 ||  || — || November 10, 1998 || Socorro || LINEAR || — || align=right | 3.3 km || 
|-id=325 bgcolor=#fefefe
| 49325 ||  || — || November 14, 1998 || Oizumi || T. Kobayashi || — || align=right | 3.9 km || 
|-id=326 bgcolor=#E9E9E9
| 49326 ||  || — || November 14, 1998 || Oizumi || T. Kobayashi || — || align=right | 4.4 km || 
|-id=327 bgcolor=#E9E9E9
| 49327 ||  || — || November 11, 1998 || Farra d'Isonzo || Farra d'Isonzo || — || align=right | 3.0 km || 
|-id=328 bgcolor=#E9E9E9
| 49328 ||  || — || November 1, 1998 || Xinglong || SCAP || — || align=right | 3.5 km || 
|-id=329 bgcolor=#E9E9E9
| 49329 ||  || — || November 9, 1998 || Xinglong || SCAP || — || align=right | 5.6 km || 
|-id=330 bgcolor=#E9E9E9
| 49330 ||  || — || November 14, 1998 || Socorro || LINEAR || — || align=right | 2.7 km || 
|-id=331 bgcolor=#E9E9E9
| 49331 ||  || — || November 10, 1998 || Socorro || LINEAR || EUN || align=right | 3.8 km || 
|-id=332 bgcolor=#fefefe
| 49332 ||  || — || November 15, 1998 || Višnjan Observatory || K. Korlević || — || align=right | 3.6 km || 
|-id=333 bgcolor=#E9E9E9
| 49333 ||  || — || November 11, 1998 || Anderson Mesa || LONEOS || — || align=right | 3.3 km || 
|-id=334 bgcolor=#fefefe
| 49334 ||  || — || November 14, 1998 || Anderson Mesa || LONEOS || — || align=right | 2.3 km || 
|-id=335 bgcolor=#E9E9E9
| 49335 ||  || — || November 14, 1998 || Anderson Mesa || LONEOS || MAR || align=right | 3.3 km || 
|-id=336 bgcolor=#E9E9E9
| 49336 ||  || — || November 10, 1998 || Socorro || LINEAR || HNS || align=right | 3.0 km || 
|-id=337 bgcolor=#E9E9E9
| 49337 ||  || — || November 11, 1998 || Socorro || LINEAR || MAR || align=right | 2.3 km || 
|-id=338 bgcolor=#E9E9E9
| 49338 ||  || — || November 13, 1998 || Socorro || LINEAR || — || align=right | 4.2 km || 
|-id=339 bgcolor=#fefefe
| 49339 ||  || — || November 14, 1998 || Socorro || LINEAR || — || align=right | 3.5 km || 
|-id=340 bgcolor=#E9E9E9
| 49340 || 1998 WG || — || November 16, 1998 || San Marcello || A. Boattini, L. Tesi || — || align=right | 2.1 km || 
|-id=341 bgcolor=#E9E9E9
| 49341 ||  || — || November 17, 1998 || Caussols || ODAS || — || align=right | 4.5 km || 
|-id=342 bgcolor=#E9E9E9
| 49342 ||  || — || November 18, 1998 || Gekko || T. Kagawa || PAD || align=right | 6.5 km || 
|-id=343 bgcolor=#E9E9E9
| 49343 ||  || — || November 19, 1998 || Oizumi || T. Kobayashi || EUN || align=right | 3.0 km || 
|-id=344 bgcolor=#E9E9E9
| 49344 ||  || — || November 20, 1998 || Farra d'Isonzo || Farra d'Isonzo || — || align=right | 5.7 km || 
|-id=345 bgcolor=#E9E9E9
| 49345 ||  || — || November 18, 1998 || Kushiro || S. Ueda, H. Kaneda || — || align=right | 7.1 km || 
|-id=346 bgcolor=#E9E9E9
| 49346 ||  || — || November 21, 1998 || Prescott || P. G. Comba || — || align=right | 4.9 km || 
|-id=347 bgcolor=#E9E9E9
| 49347 ||  || — || November 18, 1998 || Catalina || CSS || — || align=right | 3.5 km || 
|-id=348 bgcolor=#E9E9E9
| 49348 ||  || — || November 23, 1998 || Oizumi || T. Kobayashi || — || align=right | 6.2 km || 
|-id=349 bgcolor=#E9E9E9
| 49349 ||  || — || November 24, 1998 || Baton Rouge || W. R. Cooney Jr., P. M. Motl || MAR || align=right | 3.8 km || 
|-id=350 bgcolor=#fefefe
| 49350 Katheynix ||  ||  || November 27, 1998 || Baton Rouge || W. R. Cooney Jr. || — || align=right | 3.4 km || 
|-id=351 bgcolor=#d6d6d6
| 49351 ||  || — || November 27, 1998 || Višnjan Observatory || K. Korlević || — || align=right | 8.2 km || 
|-id=352 bgcolor=#fefefe
| 49352 ||  || — || November 28, 1998 || Višnjan Observatory || K. Korlević || V || align=right | 3.9 km || 
|-id=353 bgcolor=#E9E9E9
| 49353 ||  || — || November 18, 1998 || Socorro || LINEAR || — || align=right | 3.1 km || 
|-id=354 bgcolor=#E9E9E9
| 49354 ||  || — || November 21, 1998 || Socorro || LINEAR || — || align=right | 3.6 km || 
|-id=355 bgcolor=#fefefe
| 49355 ||  || — || November 21, 1998 || Socorro || LINEAR || NYS || align=right | 2.2 km || 
|-id=356 bgcolor=#E9E9E9
| 49356 ||  || — || November 21, 1998 || Socorro || LINEAR || — || align=right | 6.1 km || 
|-id=357 bgcolor=#E9E9E9
| 49357 ||  || — || November 21, 1998 || Socorro || LINEAR || — || align=right | 3.5 km || 
|-id=358 bgcolor=#fefefe
| 49358 ||  || — || November 21, 1998 || Socorro || LINEAR || NYS || align=right | 5.3 km || 
|-id=359 bgcolor=#E9E9E9
| 49359 ||  || — || November 21, 1998 || Socorro || LINEAR || WIT || align=right | 2.5 km || 
|-id=360 bgcolor=#fefefe
| 49360 ||  || — || November 21, 1998 || Socorro || LINEAR || — || align=right | 2.9 km || 
|-id=361 bgcolor=#E9E9E9
| 49361 ||  || — || November 21, 1998 || Socorro || LINEAR || — || align=right | 5.9 km || 
|-id=362 bgcolor=#E9E9E9
| 49362 ||  || — || November 21, 1998 || Socorro || LINEAR || — || align=right | 5.5 km || 
|-id=363 bgcolor=#E9E9E9
| 49363 ||  || — || November 21, 1998 || Socorro || LINEAR || HEN || align=right | 3.6 km || 
|-id=364 bgcolor=#E9E9E9
| 49364 ||  || — || November 21, 1998 || Socorro || LINEAR || — || align=right | 3.2 km || 
|-id=365 bgcolor=#E9E9E9
| 49365 ||  || — || November 21, 1998 || Socorro || LINEAR || — || align=right | 4.5 km || 
|-id=366 bgcolor=#E9E9E9
| 49366 ||  || — || November 21, 1998 || Socorro || LINEAR || — || align=right | 4.0 km || 
|-id=367 bgcolor=#E9E9E9
| 49367 ||  || — || November 23, 1998 || Socorro || LINEAR || EUN || align=right | 5.5 km || 
|-id=368 bgcolor=#E9E9E9
| 49368 ||  || — || November 23, 1998 || Socorro || LINEAR || — || align=right | 8.3 km || 
|-id=369 bgcolor=#E9E9E9
| 49369 ||  || — || November 23, 1998 || Socorro || LINEAR || — || align=right | 2.9 km || 
|-id=370 bgcolor=#E9E9E9
| 49370 ||  || — || November 18, 1998 || Socorro || LINEAR || — || align=right | 4.3 km || 
|-id=371 bgcolor=#E9E9E9
| 49371 ||  || — || November 18, 1998 || Socorro || LINEAR || — || align=right | 3.3 km || 
|-id=372 bgcolor=#E9E9E9
| 49372 ||  || — || November 26, 1998 || Kitt Peak || Spacewatch || EUN || align=right | 3.2 km || 
|-id=373 bgcolor=#E9E9E9
| 49373 ||  || — || November 18, 1998 || Kitt Peak || Spacewatch || — || align=right | 4.6 km || 
|-id=374 bgcolor=#E9E9E9
| 49374 ||  || — || November 19, 1998 || Kitt Peak || Spacewatch || — || align=right | 3.5 km || 
|-id=375 bgcolor=#E9E9E9
| 49375 ||  || — || November 21, 1998 || Kitt Peak || Spacewatch || — || align=right | 2.3 km || 
|-id=376 bgcolor=#E9E9E9
| 49376 ||  || — || November 18, 1998 || Socorro || LINEAR || — || align=right | 3.2 km || 
|-id=377 bgcolor=#E9E9E9
| 49377 ||  || — || November 24, 1998 || Socorro || LINEAR || — || align=right | 5.2 km || 
|-id=378 bgcolor=#E9E9E9
| 49378 ||  || — || December 7, 1998 || Xinglong || SCAP || EUN || align=right | 6.2 km || 
|-id=379 bgcolor=#E9E9E9
| 49379 ||  || — || December 8, 1998 || Xinglong || SCAP || — || align=right | 3.4 km || 
|-id=380 bgcolor=#d6d6d6
| 49380 ||  || — || December 12, 1998 || Oizumi || T. Kobayashi || KOR || align=right | 3.6 km || 
|-id=381 bgcolor=#d6d6d6
| 49381 ||  || — || December 12, 1998 || Oizumi || T. Kobayashi || — || align=right | 7.7 km || 
|-id=382 bgcolor=#E9E9E9
| 49382 Lynnokamoto ||  ||  || December 12, 1998 || Goodricke-Pigott || R. A. Tucker || ADE || align=right | 6.7 km || 
|-id=383 bgcolor=#E9E9E9
| 49383 ||  || — || December 8, 1998 || Kitt Peak || Spacewatch || — || align=right | 2.8 km || 
|-id=384 bgcolor=#E9E9E9
| 49384 Hubertnaudot ||  ||  || December 12, 1998 || Blauvac || R. Roy || — || align=right | 3.6 km || 
|-id=385 bgcolor=#FA8072
| 49385 ||  || — || December 14, 1998 || Socorro || LINEAR || PHO || align=right | 5.4 km || 
|-id=386 bgcolor=#E9E9E9
| 49386 ||  || — || December 4, 1998 || Xinglong || SCAP || — || align=right | 4.0 km || 
|-id=387 bgcolor=#E9E9E9
| 49387 ||  || — || December 14, 1998 || Socorro || LINEAR || — || align=right | 5.5 km || 
|-id=388 bgcolor=#d6d6d6
| 49388 ||  || — || December 10, 1998 || Kitt Peak || Spacewatch || KOR || align=right | 3.9 km || 
|-id=389 bgcolor=#E9E9E9
| 49389 ||  || — || December 10, 1998 || Kitt Peak || Spacewatch || — || align=right | 6.6 km || 
|-id=390 bgcolor=#d6d6d6
| 49390 ||  || — || December 10, 1998 || Kitt Peak || Spacewatch || CHA || align=right | 5.3 km || 
|-id=391 bgcolor=#E9E9E9
| 49391 ||  || — || December 13, 1998 || Kitt Peak || Spacewatch || — || align=right | 3.1 km || 
|-id=392 bgcolor=#E9E9E9
| 49392 ||  || — || December 15, 1998 || Xinglong || SCAP || — || align=right | 5.3 km || 
|-id=393 bgcolor=#E9E9E9
| 49393 ||  || — || December 14, 1998 || Socorro || LINEAR || — || align=right | 3.8 km || 
|-id=394 bgcolor=#E9E9E9
| 49394 ||  || — || December 14, 1998 || Socorro || LINEAR || HNS || align=right | 3.1 km || 
|-id=395 bgcolor=#E9E9E9
| 49395 ||  || — || December 14, 1998 || Socorro || LINEAR || EUN || align=right | 3.6 km || 
|-id=396 bgcolor=#fefefe
| 49396 ||  || — || December 14, 1998 || Socorro || LINEAR || — || align=right | 4.2 km || 
|-id=397 bgcolor=#E9E9E9
| 49397 ||  || — || December 14, 1998 || Socorro || LINEAR || — || align=right | 4.4 km || 
|-id=398 bgcolor=#E9E9E9
| 49398 ||  || — || December 14, 1998 || Socorro || LINEAR || DOR || align=right | 6.9 km || 
|-id=399 bgcolor=#E9E9E9
| 49399 ||  || — || December 14, 1998 || Socorro || LINEAR || — || align=right | 5.7 km || 
|-id=400 bgcolor=#E9E9E9
| 49400 ||  || — || December 14, 1998 || Socorro || LINEAR || — || align=right | 3.9 km || 
|}

49401–49500 

|-bgcolor=#E9E9E9
| 49401 ||  || — || December 14, 1998 || Socorro || LINEAR || ADE || align=right | 6.1 km || 
|-id=402 bgcolor=#E9E9E9
| 49402 ||  || — || December 14, 1998 || Socorro || LINEAR || — || align=right | 7.4 km || 
|-id=403 bgcolor=#E9E9E9
| 49403 ||  || — || December 14, 1998 || Socorro || LINEAR || EUN || align=right | 4.7 km || 
|-id=404 bgcolor=#E9E9E9
| 49404 ||  || — || December 14, 1998 || Socorro || LINEAR || — || align=right | 5.3 km || 
|-id=405 bgcolor=#E9E9E9
| 49405 ||  || — || December 14, 1998 || Socorro || LINEAR || — || align=right | 2.5 km || 
|-id=406 bgcolor=#E9E9E9
| 49406 ||  || — || December 14, 1998 || Socorro || LINEAR || — || align=right | 5.0 km || 
|-id=407 bgcolor=#E9E9E9
| 49407 ||  || — || December 14, 1998 || Socorro || LINEAR || — || align=right | 4.1 km || 
|-id=408 bgcolor=#E9E9E9
| 49408 ||  || — || December 14, 1998 || Socorro || LINEAR || HEN || align=right | 4.3 km || 
|-id=409 bgcolor=#d6d6d6
| 49409 ||  || — || December 14, 1998 || Socorro || LINEAR || — || align=right | 5.2 km || 
|-id=410 bgcolor=#d6d6d6
| 49410 ||  || — || December 14, 1998 || Socorro || LINEAR || — || align=right | 4.3 km || 
|-id=411 bgcolor=#d6d6d6
| 49411 ||  || — || December 14, 1998 || Socorro || LINEAR || — || align=right | 11 km || 
|-id=412 bgcolor=#E9E9E9
| 49412 ||  || — || December 15, 1998 || Socorro || LINEAR || — || align=right | 6.7 km || 
|-id=413 bgcolor=#E9E9E9
| 49413 ||  || — || December 14, 1998 || Socorro || LINEAR || — || align=right | 7.3 km || 
|-id=414 bgcolor=#E9E9E9
| 49414 ||  || — || December 14, 1998 || Socorro || LINEAR || — || align=right | 3.4 km || 
|-id=415 bgcolor=#E9E9E9
| 49415 ||  || — || December 14, 1998 || Socorro || LINEAR || GEF || align=right | 3.3 km || 
|-id=416 bgcolor=#E9E9E9
| 49416 ||  || — || December 14, 1998 || Socorro || LINEAR || EUN || align=right | 3.8 km || 
|-id=417 bgcolor=#E9E9E9
| 49417 ||  || — || December 14, 1998 || Socorro || LINEAR || — || align=right | 4.7 km || 
|-id=418 bgcolor=#E9E9E9
| 49418 ||  || — || December 14, 1998 || Socorro || LINEAR || RAF || align=right | 4.1 km || 
|-id=419 bgcolor=#E9E9E9
| 49419 ||  || — || December 14, 1998 || Socorro || LINEAR || EUN || align=right | 3.5 km || 
|-id=420 bgcolor=#E9E9E9
| 49420 ||  || — || December 14, 1998 || Socorro || LINEAR || — || align=right | 8.0 km || 
|-id=421 bgcolor=#E9E9E9
| 49421 ||  || — || December 15, 1998 || Socorro || LINEAR || AGN || align=right | 4.7 km || 
|-id=422 bgcolor=#E9E9E9
| 49422 ||  || — || December 15, 1998 || Socorro || LINEAR || — || align=right | 4.3 km || 
|-id=423 bgcolor=#E9E9E9
| 49423 ||  || — || December 15, 1998 || Socorro || LINEAR || — || align=right | 2.9 km || 
|-id=424 bgcolor=#E9E9E9
| 49424 ||  || — || December 15, 1998 || Socorro || LINEAR || DOR || align=right | 9.0 km || 
|-id=425 bgcolor=#E9E9E9
| 49425 ||  || — || December 15, 1998 || Socorro || LINEAR || ADE || align=right | 6.1 km || 
|-id=426 bgcolor=#E9E9E9
| 49426 ||  || — || December 15, 1998 || Socorro || LINEAR || — || align=right | 4.3 km || 
|-id=427 bgcolor=#E9E9E9
| 49427 ||  || — || December 15, 1998 || Socorro || LINEAR || EUN || align=right | 4.0 km || 
|-id=428 bgcolor=#E9E9E9
| 49428 ||  || — || December 15, 1998 || Socorro || LINEAR || CLO || align=right | 8.6 km || 
|-id=429 bgcolor=#E9E9E9
| 49429 ||  || — || December 2, 1998 || Xinglong || SCAP || — || align=right | 2.1 km || 
|-id=430 bgcolor=#d6d6d6
| 49430 ||  || — || December 11, 1998 || Mérida || O. A. Naranjo || — || align=right | 4.0 km || 
|-id=431 bgcolor=#E9E9E9
| 49431 ||  || — || December 15, 1998 || Socorro || LINEAR || — || align=right | 6.7 km || 
|-id=432 bgcolor=#E9E9E9
| 49432 || 1998 YD || — || December 16, 1998 || Višnjan Observatory || K. Korlević || HNS || align=right | 4.7 km || 
|-id=433 bgcolor=#d6d6d6
| 49433 || 1998 YS || — || December 16, 1998 || Oizumi || T. Kobayashi || — || align=right | 7.2 km || 
|-id=434 bgcolor=#E9E9E9
| 49434 ||  || — || December 16, 1998 || Gekko || T. Kagawa || — || align=right | 6.8 km || 
|-id=435 bgcolor=#d6d6d6
| 49435 ||  || — || December 16, 1998 || Gekko || T. Kagawa || — || align=right | 6.1 km || 
|-id=436 bgcolor=#E9E9E9
| 49436 ||  || — || December 17, 1998 || Ondřejov || P. Pravec, U. Babiaková || — || align=right | 2.3 km || 
|-id=437 bgcolor=#E9E9E9
| 49437 ||  || — || December 17, 1998 || Gekko || T. Kagawa || — || align=right | 2.5 km || 
|-id=438 bgcolor=#d6d6d6
| 49438 ||  || — || December 19, 1998 || Oizumi || T. Kobayashi || — || align=right | 5.0 km || 
|-id=439 bgcolor=#d6d6d6
| 49439 ||  || — || December 17, 1998 || Caussols || ODAS || EOS || align=right | 4.8 km || 
|-id=440 bgcolor=#d6d6d6
| 49440 Kenzotange ||  ||  || December 21, 1998 || Kuma Kogen || A. Nakamura || — || align=right | 7.0 km || 
|-id=441 bgcolor=#E9E9E9
| 49441 Scerbanenco ||  ||  || December 22, 1998 || Bologna || San Vittore Obs. || — || align=right | 2.1 km || 
|-id=442 bgcolor=#d6d6d6
| 49442 ||  || — || December 20, 1998 || Uto || F. Uto || — || align=right | 7.5 km || 
|-id=443 bgcolor=#E9E9E9
| 49443 Marcobondi ||  ||  || December 22, 1998 || Montelupo || D. Guidetti, E. Masotti || MIT || align=right | 6.3 km || 
|-id=444 bgcolor=#E9E9E9
| 49444 ||  || — || December 22, 1998 || Gekko || T. Kagawa || — || align=right | 3.1 km || 
|-id=445 bgcolor=#E9E9E9
| 49445 ||  || — || December 17, 1998 || Xinglong || SCAP || — || align=right | 3.1 km || 
|-id=446 bgcolor=#E9E9E9
| 49446 ||  || — || December 25, 1998 || Višnjan Observatory || K. Korlević, M. Jurić || — || align=right | 4.1 km || 
|-id=447 bgcolor=#d6d6d6
| 49447 ||  || — || December 26, 1998 || Oizumi || T. Kobayashi || — || align=right | 9.5 km || 
|-id=448 bgcolor=#E9E9E9
| 49448 Macocha ||  ||  || December 21, 1998 || Ondřejov || P. Pravec || — || align=right | 3.5 km || 
|-id=449 bgcolor=#E9E9E9
| 49449 ||  || — || December 17, 1998 || Kitt Peak || Spacewatch || GEF || align=right | 3.3 km || 
|-id=450 bgcolor=#E9E9E9
| 49450 ||  || — || December 19, 1998 || Kitt Peak || Spacewatch || — || align=right | 7.0 km || 
|-id=451 bgcolor=#E9E9E9
| 49451 ||  || — || December 25, 1998 || Kitt Peak || Spacewatch || — || align=right | 2.4 km || 
|-id=452 bgcolor=#E9E9E9
| 49452 ||  || — || December 25, 1998 || Kitt Peak || Spacewatch || AGN || align=right | 3.1 km || 
|-id=453 bgcolor=#E9E9E9
| 49453 ||  || — || December 25, 1998 || Kitt Peak || Spacewatch || — || align=right | 5.7 km || 
|-id=454 bgcolor=#fefefe
| 49454 ||  || — || December 30, 1998 || Baton Rouge || W. R. Cooney Jr., T. Martin || — || align=right | 1.7 km || 
|-id=455 bgcolor=#E9E9E9
| 49455 ||  || — || December 29, 1998 || Xinglong || SCAP || — || align=right | 7.9 km || 
|-id=456 bgcolor=#E9E9E9
| 49456 ||  || — || December 21, 1998 || Socorro || LINEAR || — || align=right | 4.0 km || 
|-id=457 bgcolor=#E9E9E9
| 49457 ||  || — || December 19, 1998 || Xinglong || SCAP || EUN || align=right | 3.3 km || 
|-id=458 bgcolor=#E9E9E9
| 49458 ||  || — || January 9, 1999 || Oizumi || T. Kobayashi || — || align=right | 3.3 km || 
|-id=459 bgcolor=#d6d6d6
| 49459 ||  || — || January 9, 1999 || Oizumi || T. Kobayashi || — || align=right | 8.9 km || 
|-id=460 bgcolor=#d6d6d6
| 49460 ||  || — || January 11, 1999 || Oizumi || T. Kobayashi || — || align=right | 6.3 km || 
|-id=461 bgcolor=#d6d6d6
| 49461 ||  || — || January 10, 1999 || Nachi-Katsuura || Y. Shimizu, T. Urata || EOS || align=right | 8.5 km || 
|-id=462 bgcolor=#E9E9E9
| 49462 ||  || — || January 9, 1999 || Višnjan Observatory || K. Korlević || — || align=right | 5.6 km || 
|-id=463 bgcolor=#d6d6d6
| 49463 ||  || — || January 9, 1999 || Višnjan Observatory || K. Korlević || EOS || align=right | 9.1 km || 
|-id=464 bgcolor=#d6d6d6
| 49464 ||  || — || January 11, 1999 || Višnjan Observatory || K. Korlević || — || align=right | 5.9 km || 
|-id=465 bgcolor=#E9E9E9
| 49465 ||  || — || January 10, 1999 || Fair Oaks Ranch || J. V. McClusky || NEM || align=right | 4.0 km || 
|-id=466 bgcolor=#E9E9E9
| 49466 Huanglin ||  ||  || January 6, 1999 || Xinglong || SCAP || GEF || align=right | 4.0 km || 
|-id=467 bgcolor=#E9E9E9
| 49467 ||  || — || January 9, 1999 || Kitt Peak || Spacewatch || — || align=right | 6.6 km || 
|-id=468 bgcolor=#E9E9E9
| 49468 ||  || — || January 15, 1999 || Oizumi || T. Kobayashi || MIT || align=right | 7.9 km || 
|-id=469 bgcolor=#d6d6d6
| 49469 Emilianomazzoni ||  ||  || January 15, 1999 || Monte Agliale || S. Donati || — || align=right | 8.6 km || 
|-id=470 bgcolor=#E9E9E9
| 49470 ||  || — || January 9, 1999 || Kitt Peak || Spacewatch || — || align=right | 9.4 km || 
|-id=471 bgcolor=#d6d6d6
| 49471 ||  || — || January 11, 1999 || Kitt Peak || Spacewatch || NAE || align=right | 6.5 km || 
|-id=472 bgcolor=#d6d6d6
| 49472 ||  || — || January 14, 1999 || Kitt Peak || Spacewatch || — || align=right | 6.4 km || 
|-id=473 bgcolor=#d6d6d6
| 49473 ||  || — || January 15, 1999 || Kitt Peak || Spacewatch || — || align=right | 5.1 km || 
|-id=474 bgcolor=#d6d6d6
| 49474 || 1999 BL || — || January 16, 1999 || Oizumi || T. Kobayashi || — || align=right | 9.0 km || 
|-id=475 bgcolor=#E9E9E9
| 49475 ||  || — || January 19, 1999 || Črni Vrh || Črni Vrh || RAF || align=right | 6.0 km || 
|-id=476 bgcolor=#fefefe
| 49476 ||  || — || January 21, 1999 || Višnjan Observatory || K. Korlević || V || align=right | 2.2 km || 
|-id=477 bgcolor=#fefefe
| 49477 ||  || — || January 21, 1999 || Višnjan Observatory || K. Korlević || NYS || align=right | 2.9 km || 
|-id=478 bgcolor=#d6d6d6
| 49478 ||  || — || January 22, 1999 || Višnjan Observatory || K. Korlević || — || align=right | 7.5 km || 
|-id=479 bgcolor=#fefefe
| 49479 ||  || — || January 22, 1999 || Višnjan Observatory || K. Korlević || V || align=right | 1.8 km || 
|-id=480 bgcolor=#d6d6d6
| 49480 ||  || — || January 23, 1999 || Višnjan Observatory || K. Korlević || — || align=right | 9.0 km || 
|-id=481 bgcolor=#d6d6d6
| 49481 Gisellarubini ||  ||  || January 24, 1999 || Monte Agliale || M. M. M. Santangelo || THM || align=right | 7.0 km || 
|-id=482 bgcolor=#d6d6d6
| 49482 ||  || — || January 24, 1999 || Višnjan Observatory || K. Korlević || — || align=right | 7.3 km || 
|-id=483 bgcolor=#E9E9E9
| 49483 ||  || — || January 25, 1999 || Višnjan Observatory || K. Korlević || — || align=right | 13 km || 
|-id=484 bgcolor=#E9E9E9
| 49484 ||  || — || January 27, 1999 || High Point || D. K. Chesney || ADE || align=right | 9.6 km || 
|-id=485 bgcolor=#d6d6d6
| 49485 ||  || — || January 16, 1999 || Socorro || LINEAR || — || align=right | 5.8 km || 
|-id=486 bgcolor=#E9E9E9
| 49486 ||  || — || January 16, 1999 || Socorro || LINEAR || — || align=right | 3.2 km || 
|-id=487 bgcolor=#E9E9E9
| 49487 ||  || — || January 18, 1999 || Socorro || LINEAR || — || align=right | 3.9 km || 
|-id=488 bgcolor=#E9E9E9
| 49488 ||  || — || January 18, 1999 || Socorro || LINEAR || ADE || align=right | 7.7 km || 
|-id=489 bgcolor=#E9E9E9
| 49489 ||  || — || January 18, 1999 || Socorro || LINEAR || — || align=right | 3.9 km || 
|-id=490 bgcolor=#E9E9E9
| 49490 ||  || — || January 18, 1999 || Socorro || LINEAR || — || align=right | 8.3 km || 
|-id=491 bgcolor=#E9E9E9
| 49491 ||  || — || January 18, 1999 || Socorro || LINEAR || — || align=right | 11 km || 
|-id=492 bgcolor=#d6d6d6
| 49492 ||  || — || January 19, 1999 || Višnjan Observatory || K. Korlević || HYG || align=right | 6.2 km || 
|-id=493 bgcolor=#fefefe
| 49493 || 1999 CD || — || February 4, 1999 || Oizumi || T. Kobayashi || FLO || align=right | 2.7 km || 
|-id=494 bgcolor=#E9E9E9
| 49494 ||  || — || February 6, 1999 || Oizumi || T. Kobayashi || GEF || align=right | 3.8 km || 
|-id=495 bgcolor=#E9E9E9
| 49495 ||  || — || February 7, 1999 || Oizumi || T. Kobayashi || — || align=right | 6.8 km || 
|-id=496 bgcolor=#E9E9E9
| 49496 ||  || — || February 8, 1999 || Oizumi || T. Kobayashi || AGN || align=right | 4.9 km || 
|-id=497 bgcolor=#d6d6d6
| 49497 ||  || — || February 8, 1999 || Uto || F. Uto || — || align=right | 9.5 km || 
|-id=498 bgcolor=#E9E9E9
| 49498 ||  || — || February 12, 1999 || Gekko || T. Kagawa || — || align=right | 6.7 km || 
|-id=499 bgcolor=#d6d6d6
| 49499 ||  || — || February 13, 1999 || Oizumi || T. Kobayashi || — || align=right | 6.3 km || 
|-id=500 bgcolor=#d6d6d6
| 49500 Ishitoshi ||  ||  || February 14, 1999 || Oizumi || T. Kobayashi || — || align=right | 8.0 km || 
|}

49501–49600 

|-bgcolor=#d6d6d6
| 49501 Basso ||  ||  || February 13, 1999 || Ceccano || G. Masi || THM || align=right | 7.6 km || 
|-id=502 bgcolor=#d6d6d6
| 49502 ||  || — || February 15, 1999 || Višnjan Observatory || K. Korlević || EOS || align=right | 7.1 km || 
|-id=503 bgcolor=#d6d6d6
| 49503 ||  || — || February 10, 1999 || Socorro || LINEAR || EOS || align=right | 7.2 km || 
|-id=504 bgcolor=#E9E9E9
| 49504 ||  || — || February 10, 1999 || Socorro || LINEAR || — || align=right | 2.8 km || 
|-id=505 bgcolor=#d6d6d6
| 49505 ||  || — || February 10, 1999 || Socorro || LINEAR || EOS || align=right | 5.9 km || 
|-id=506 bgcolor=#E9E9E9
| 49506 ||  || — || February 10, 1999 || Socorro || LINEAR || GEF || align=right | 3.2 km || 
|-id=507 bgcolor=#E9E9E9
| 49507 ||  || — || February 10, 1999 || Socorro || LINEAR || EUN || align=right | 3.6 km || 
|-id=508 bgcolor=#d6d6d6
| 49508 ||  || — || February 10, 1999 || Socorro || LINEAR || — || align=right | 4.2 km || 
|-id=509 bgcolor=#d6d6d6
| 49509 ||  || — || February 10, 1999 || Socorro || LINEAR || EOS || align=right | 4.7 km || 
|-id=510 bgcolor=#E9E9E9
| 49510 ||  || — || February 10, 1999 || Socorro || LINEAR || — || align=right | 3.3 km || 
|-id=511 bgcolor=#E9E9E9
| 49511 ||  || — || February 10, 1999 || Socorro || LINEAR || — || align=right | 5.3 km || 
|-id=512 bgcolor=#E9E9E9
| 49512 ||  || — || February 10, 1999 || Socorro || LINEAR || — || align=right | 3.7 km || 
|-id=513 bgcolor=#d6d6d6
| 49513 ||  || — || February 10, 1999 || Socorro || LINEAR || ALA || align=right | 19 km || 
|-id=514 bgcolor=#E9E9E9
| 49514 ||  || — || February 10, 1999 || Socorro || LINEAR || — || align=right | 5.0 km || 
|-id=515 bgcolor=#E9E9E9
| 49515 ||  || — || February 10, 1999 || Socorro || LINEAR || — || align=right | 3.7 km || 
|-id=516 bgcolor=#d6d6d6
| 49516 ||  || — || February 10, 1999 || Socorro || LINEAR || — || align=right | 11 km || 
|-id=517 bgcolor=#d6d6d6
| 49517 ||  || — || February 10, 1999 || Socorro || LINEAR || — || align=right | 8.5 km || 
|-id=518 bgcolor=#d6d6d6
| 49518 ||  || — || February 10, 1999 || Socorro || LINEAR || — || align=right | 6.1 km || 
|-id=519 bgcolor=#d6d6d6
| 49519 ||  || — || February 10, 1999 || Socorro || LINEAR || EOS || align=right | 5.8 km || 
|-id=520 bgcolor=#d6d6d6
| 49520 ||  || — || February 10, 1999 || Socorro || LINEAR || — || align=right | 7.1 km || 
|-id=521 bgcolor=#E9E9E9
| 49521 ||  || — || February 10, 1999 || Socorro || LINEAR || — || align=right | 2.5 km || 
|-id=522 bgcolor=#d6d6d6
| 49522 ||  || — || February 10, 1999 || Socorro || LINEAR || — || align=right | 5.3 km || 
|-id=523 bgcolor=#d6d6d6
| 49523 ||  || — || February 10, 1999 || Socorro || LINEAR || — || align=right | 11 km || 
|-id=524 bgcolor=#d6d6d6
| 49524 ||  || — || February 10, 1999 || Socorro || LINEAR || — || align=right | 4.9 km || 
|-id=525 bgcolor=#E9E9E9
| 49525 ||  || — || February 10, 1999 || Socorro || LINEAR || EUN || align=right | 4.8 km || 
|-id=526 bgcolor=#d6d6d6
| 49526 ||  || — || February 10, 1999 || Socorro || LINEAR || TIR || align=right | 4.8 km || 
|-id=527 bgcolor=#E9E9E9
| 49527 ||  || — || February 10, 1999 || Socorro || LINEAR || — || align=right | 3.7 km || 
|-id=528 bgcolor=#d6d6d6
| 49528 ||  || — || February 10, 1999 || Socorro || LINEAR || — || align=right | 7.5 km || 
|-id=529 bgcolor=#d6d6d6
| 49529 ||  || — || February 10, 1999 || Socorro || LINEAR || — || align=right | 5.3 km || 
|-id=530 bgcolor=#d6d6d6
| 49530 ||  || — || February 10, 1999 || Socorro || LINEAR || — || align=right | 7.3 km || 
|-id=531 bgcolor=#d6d6d6
| 49531 ||  || — || February 10, 1999 || Socorro || LINEAR || EOS || align=right | 7.1 km || 
|-id=532 bgcolor=#d6d6d6
| 49532 ||  || — || February 10, 1999 || Socorro || LINEAR || — || align=right | 8.8 km || 
|-id=533 bgcolor=#d6d6d6
| 49533 ||  || — || February 10, 1999 || Socorro || LINEAR || EOS || align=right | 7.8 km || 
|-id=534 bgcolor=#E9E9E9
| 49534 ||  || — || February 10, 1999 || Socorro || LINEAR || AEO || align=right | 5.6 km || 
|-id=535 bgcolor=#d6d6d6
| 49535 ||  || — || February 10, 1999 || Socorro || LINEAR || — || align=right | 8.1 km || 
|-id=536 bgcolor=#E9E9E9
| 49536 ||  || — || February 12, 1999 || Socorro || LINEAR || — || align=right | 4.7 km || 
|-id=537 bgcolor=#d6d6d6
| 49537 ||  || — || February 12, 1999 || Socorro || LINEAR || — || align=right | 6.1 km || 
|-id=538 bgcolor=#d6d6d6
| 49538 ||  || — || February 12, 1999 || Socorro || LINEAR || HYG || align=right | 7.6 km || 
|-id=539 bgcolor=#E9E9E9
| 49539 ||  || — || February 12, 1999 || Socorro || LINEAR || EUN || align=right | 4.0 km || 
|-id=540 bgcolor=#d6d6d6
| 49540 ||  || — || February 12, 1999 || Socorro || LINEAR || — || align=right | 11 km || 
|-id=541 bgcolor=#d6d6d6
| 49541 ||  || — || February 12, 1999 || Socorro || LINEAR || EOS || align=right | 6.2 km || 
|-id=542 bgcolor=#d6d6d6
| 49542 ||  || — || February 12, 1999 || Socorro || LINEAR || — || align=right | 9.9 km || 
|-id=543 bgcolor=#E9E9E9
| 49543 ||  || — || February 12, 1999 || Socorro || LINEAR || — || align=right | 4.8 km || 
|-id=544 bgcolor=#d6d6d6
| 49544 ||  || — || February 12, 1999 || Socorro || LINEAR || — || align=right | 5.8 km || 
|-id=545 bgcolor=#d6d6d6
| 49545 ||  || — || February 12, 1999 || Socorro || LINEAR || — || align=right | 5.5 km || 
|-id=546 bgcolor=#E9E9E9
| 49546 ||  || — || February 12, 1999 || Socorro || LINEAR || DOR || align=right | 7.9 km || 
|-id=547 bgcolor=#d6d6d6
| 49547 ||  || — || February 10, 1999 || Socorro || LINEAR || — || align=right | 8.2 km || 
|-id=548 bgcolor=#E9E9E9
| 49548 ||  || — || February 10, 1999 || Socorro || LINEAR || — || align=right | 7.3 km || 
|-id=549 bgcolor=#d6d6d6
| 49549 ||  || — || February 10, 1999 || Socorro || LINEAR || — || align=right | 6.5 km || 
|-id=550 bgcolor=#E9E9E9
| 49550 ||  || — || February 10, 1999 || Socorro || LINEAR || — || align=right | 3.9 km || 
|-id=551 bgcolor=#E9E9E9
| 49551 ||  || — || February 10, 1999 || Socorro || LINEAR || GEF || align=right | 3.6 km || 
|-id=552 bgcolor=#E9E9E9
| 49552 ||  || — || February 10, 1999 || Socorro || LINEAR || — || align=right | 2.9 km || 
|-id=553 bgcolor=#E9E9E9
| 49553 ||  || — || February 10, 1999 || Socorro || LINEAR || DOR || align=right | 7.7 km || 
|-id=554 bgcolor=#E9E9E9
| 49554 ||  || — || February 10, 1999 || Socorro || LINEAR || — || align=right | 4.6 km || 
|-id=555 bgcolor=#E9E9E9
| 49555 ||  || — || February 10, 1999 || Socorro || LINEAR || — || align=right | 6.8 km || 
|-id=556 bgcolor=#d6d6d6
| 49556 ||  || — || February 10, 1999 || Socorro || LINEAR || — || align=right | 9.0 km || 
|-id=557 bgcolor=#d6d6d6
| 49557 ||  || — || February 10, 1999 || Socorro || LINEAR || EOS || align=right | 5.4 km || 
|-id=558 bgcolor=#d6d6d6
| 49558 ||  || — || February 10, 1999 || Socorro || LINEAR || — || align=right | 4.9 km || 
|-id=559 bgcolor=#E9E9E9
| 49559 ||  || — || February 10, 1999 || Socorro || LINEAR || — || align=right | 6.1 km || 
|-id=560 bgcolor=#d6d6d6
| 49560 ||  || — || February 10, 1999 || Socorro || LINEAR || — || align=right | 6.7 km || 
|-id=561 bgcolor=#d6d6d6
| 49561 ||  || — || February 10, 1999 || Socorro || LINEAR || — || align=right | 6.2 km || 
|-id=562 bgcolor=#E9E9E9
| 49562 ||  || — || February 10, 1999 || Socorro || LINEAR || GEF || align=right | 4.0 km || 
|-id=563 bgcolor=#d6d6d6
| 49563 ||  || — || February 10, 1999 || Socorro || LINEAR || — || align=right | 7.7 km || 
|-id=564 bgcolor=#E9E9E9
| 49564 ||  || — || February 12, 1999 || Socorro || LINEAR || — || align=right | 6.1 km || 
|-id=565 bgcolor=#d6d6d6
| 49565 ||  || — || February 12, 1999 || Socorro || LINEAR || THM || align=right | 7.2 km || 
|-id=566 bgcolor=#E9E9E9
| 49566 ||  || — || February 12, 1999 || Socorro || LINEAR || — || align=right | 9.4 km || 
|-id=567 bgcolor=#d6d6d6
| 49567 ||  || — || February 12, 1999 || Socorro || LINEAR || EOS || align=right | 7.8 km || 
|-id=568 bgcolor=#d6d6d6
| 49568 ||  || — || February 12, 1999 || Socorro || LINEAR || — || align=right | 11 km || 
|-id=569 bgcolor=#d6d6d6
| 49569 ||  || — || February 12, 1999 || Socorro || LINEAR || — || align=right | 6.5 km || 
|-id=570 bgcolor=#d6d6d6
| 49570 ||  || — || February 12, 1999 || Socorro || LINEAR || EOS || align=right | 7.3 km || 
|-id=571 bgcolor=#d6d6d6
| 49571 ||  || — || February 12, 1999 || Socorro || LINEAR || ALA || align=right | 8.2 km || 
|-id=572 bgcolor=#E9E9E9
| 49572 ||  || — || February 12, 1999 || Socorro || LINEAR || — || align=right | 4.6 km || 
|-id=573 bgcolor=#d6d6d6
| 49573 ||  || — || February 12, 1999 || Socorro || LINEAR || — || align=right | 11 km || 
|-id=574 bgcolor=#d6d6d6
| 49574 ||  || — || February 11, 1999 || Socorro || LINEAR || TIR || align=right | 5.9 km || 
|-id=575 bgcolor=#E9E9E9
| 49575 ||  || — || February 11, 1999 || Socorro || LINEAR || EUN || align=right | 4.0 km || 
|-id=576 bgcolor=#E9E9E9
| 49576 ||  || — || February 11, 1999 || Socorro || LINEAR || HNS || align=right | 5.6 km || 
|-id=577 bgcolor=#E9E9E9
| 49577 ||  || — || February 11, 1999 || Socorro || LINEAR || — || align=right | 7.0 km || 
|-id=578 bgcolor=#E9E9E9
| 49578 ||  || — || February 11, 1999 || Socorro || LINEAR || MAR || align=right | 4.2 km || 
|-id=579 bgcolor=#E9E9E9
| 49579 ||  || — || February 11, 1999 || Socorro || LINEAR || MAR || align=right | 3.6 km || 
|-id=580 bgcolor=#E9E9E9
| 49580 ||  || — || February 11, 1999 || Socorro || LINEAR || — || align=right | 4.1 km || 
|-id=581 bgcolor=#d6d6d6
| 49581 ||  || — || February 11, 1999 || Socorro || LINEAR || — || align=right | 10 km || 
|-id=582 bgcolor=#E9E9E9
| 49582 ||  || — || February 11, 1999 || Outside Phoenix, Arizona || LINEAR || EUN || align=right | 5.0 km || 
|-id=583 bgcolor=#fefefe
| 49583 ||  || — || February 9, 1999 || Kitt Peak || Spacewatch || NYS || align=right | 2.0 km || 
|-id=584 bgcolor=#d6d6d6
| 49584 ||  || — || February 7, 1999 || Kitt Peak || Spacewatch || THM || align=right | 7.6 km || 
|-id=585 bgcolor=#d6d6d6
| 49585 ||  || — || February 9, 1999 || Kitt Peak || Spacewatch || THM || align=right | 8.2 km || 
|-id=586 bgcolor=#d6d6d6
| 49586 ||  || — || February 11, 1999 || Kitt Peak || Spacewatch || slow? || align=right | 6.0 km || 
|-id=587 bgcolor=#d6d6d6
| 49587 ||  || — || February 8, 1999 || Kitt Peak || Spacewatch || — || align=right | 6.8 km || 
|-id=588 bgcolor=#d6d6d6
| 49588 ||  || — || February 13, 1999 || Kitt Peak || Spacewatch || — || align=right | 5.3 km || 
|-id=589 bgcolor=#d6d6d6
| 49589 ||  || — || February 13, 1999 || Kitt Peak || Spacewatch || — || align=right | 6.4 km || 
|-id=590 bgcolor=#d6d6d6
| 49590 ||  || — || February 18, 1999 || Haleakala || NEAT || — || align=right | 6.4 km || 
|-id=591 bgcolor=#d6d6d6
| 49591 ||  || — || February 19, 1999 || Oizumi || T. Kobayashi || — || align=right | 18 km || 
|-id=592 bgcolor=#d6d6d6
| 49592 ||  || — || February 25, 1999 || Uccle || T. Pauwels || NAE || align=right | 10 km || 
|-id=593 bgcolor=#d6d6d6
| 49593 ||  || — || February 18, 1999 || Anderson Mesa || LONEOS || — || align=right | 6.7 km || 
|-id=594 bgcolor=#d6d6d6
| 49594 ||  || — || March 10, 1999 || Kitt Peak || Spacewatch || — || align=right | 7.0 km || 
|-id=595 bgcolor=#d6d6d6
| 49595 || 1999 FG || — || March 16, 1999 || Višnjan Observatory || K. Korlević, M. Jurić || EOS || align=right | 7.3 km || 
|-id=596 bgcolor=#fefefe
| 49596 ||  || — || March 17, 1999 || Kitt Peak || Spacewatch || — || align=right | 1.7 km || 
|-id=597 bgcolor=#d6d6d6
| 49597 ||  || — || March 19, 1999 || Kitt Peak || Spacewatch || EOS || align=right | 5.5 km || 
|-id=598 bgcolor=#d6d6d6
| 49598 ||  || — || March 23, 1999 || Kitt Peak || Spacewatch || — || align=right | 15 km || 
|-id=599 bgcolor=#d6d6d6
| 49599 ||  || — || March 22, 1999 || Anderson Mesa || LONEOS || — || align=right | 12 km || 
|-id=600 bgcolor=#d6d6d6
| 49600 ||  || — || March 22, 1999 || Anderson Mesa || LONEOS || — || align=right | 13 km || 
|}

49601–49700 

|-bgcolor=#d6d6d6
| 49601 ||  || — || March 19, 1999 || Socorro || LINEAR || — || align=right | 9.3 km || 
|-id=602 bgcolor=#d6d6d6
| 49602 ||  || — || March 19, 1999 || Socorro || LINEAR || — || align=right | 11 km || 
|-id=603 bgcolor=#d6d6d6
| 49603 ||  || — || March 19, 1999 || Socorro || LINEAR || — || align=right | 8.2 km || 
|-id=604 bgcolor=#d6d6d6
| 49604 ||  || — || March 19, 1999 || Socorro || LINEAR || HYG || align=right | 8.4 km || 
|-id=605 bgcolor=#d6d6d6
| 49605 ||  || — || March 19, 1999 || Socorro || LINEAR || HYG || align=right | 9.2 km || 
|-id=606 bgcolor=#d6d6d6
| 49606 ||  || — || March 19, 1999 || Socorro || LINEAR || — || align=right | 16 km || 
|-id=607 bgcolor=#d6d6d6
| 49607 ||  || — || March 19, 1999 || Socorro || LINEAR || — || align=right | 10 km || 
|-id=608 bgcolor=#d6d6d6
| 49608 ||  || — || March 19, 1999 || Socorro || LINEAR || THM || align=right | 7.1 km || 
|-id=609 bgcolor=#d6d6d6
| 49609 ||  || — || March 19, 1999 || Socorro || LINEAR || — || align=right | 6.7 km || 
|-id=610 bgcolor=#fefefe
| 49610 ||  || — || March 19, 1999 || Socorro || LINEAR || — || align=right | 2.4 km || 
|-id=611 bgcolor=#d6d6d6
| 49611 ||  || — || March 19, 1999 || Socorro || LINEAR || HYG || align=right | 7.7 km || 
|-id=612 bgcolor=#d6d6d6
| 49612 ||  || — || March 19, 1999 || Socorro || LINEAR || ALA || align=right | 9.5 km || 
|-id=613 bgcolor=#d6d6d6
| 49613 ||  || — || March 23, 1999 || Višnjan Observatory || K. Korlević || THM || align=right | 8.8 km || 
|-id=614 bgcolor=#d6d6d6
| 49614 ||  || — || March 20, 1999 || Socorro || LINEAR || — || align=right | 9.1 km || 
|-id=615 bgcolor=#d6d6d6
| 49615 ||  || — || March 20, 1999 || Socorro || LINEAR || — || align=right | 7.1 km || 
|-id=616 bgcolor=#d6d6d6
| 49616 ||  || — || March 20, 1999 || Socorro || LINEAR || — || align=right | 10 km || 
|-id=617 bgcolor=#d6d6d6
| 49617 ||  || — || March 20, 1999 || Socorro || LINEAR || — || align=right | 6.4 km || 
|-id=618 bgcolor=#d6d6d6
| 49618 ||  || — || March 20, 1999 || Socorro || LINEAR || — || align=right | 6.2 km || 
|-id=619 bgcolor=#d6d6d6
| 49619 ||  || — || March 20, 1999 || Socorro || LINEAR || — || align=right | 7.0 km || 
|-id=620 bgcolor=#d6d6d6
| 49620 ||  || — || March 20, 1999 || Socorro || LINEAR || EOS || align=right | 6.8 km || 
|-id=621 bgcolor=#fefefe
| 49621 || 1999 GL || — || April 6, 1999 || Prescott || P. G. Comba || NYS || align=right | 1.7 km || 
|-id=622 bgcolor=#d6d6d6
| 49622 ||  || — || April 9, 1999 || Višnjan Observatory || K. Korlević || VER || align=right | 11 km || 
|-id=623 bgcolor=#d6d6d6
| 49623 ||  || — || April 7, 1999 || Nachi-Katsuura || Y. Shimizu, T. Urata || — || align=right | 8.9 km || 
|-id=624 bgcolor=#d6d6d6
| 49624 ||  || — || April 11, 1999 || Kitt Peak || Spacewatch || ITH || align=right | 7.7 km || 
|-id=625 bgcolor=#d6d6d6
| 49625 ||  || — || April 11, 1999 || Kitt Peak || Spacewatch || — || align=right | 4.9 km || 
|-id=626 bgcolor=#d6d6d6
| 49626 ||  || — || April 9, 1999 || Socorro || LINEAR || — || align=right | 7.7 km || 
|-id=627 bgcolor=#E9E9E9
| 49627 ||  || — || April 15, 1999 || Socorro || LINEAR || EUN || align=right | 5.9 km || 
|-id=628 bgcolor=#d6d6d6
| 49628 ||  || — || April 15, 1999 || Socorro || LINEAR || EOS || align=right | 10 km || 
|-id=629 bgcolor=#d6d6d6
| 49629 ||  || — || April 15, 1999 || Socorro || LINEAR || — || align=right | 7.4 km || 
|-id=630 bgcolor=#d6d6d6
| 49630 ||  || — || April 15, 1999 || Socorro || LINEAR || — || align=right | 22 km || 
|-id=631 bgcolor=#d6d6d6
| 49631 ||  || — || April 6, 1999 || Socorro || LINEAR || — || align=right | 8.5 km || 
|-id=632 bgcolor=#d6d6d6
| 49632 ||  || — || April 12, 1999 || Socorro || LINEAR || — || align=right | 9.0 km || 
|-id=633 bgcolor=#d6d6d6
| 49633 ||  || — || April 12, 1999 || Socorro || LINEAR || — || align=right | 14 km || 
|-id=634 bgcolor=#d6d6d6
| 49634 ||  || — || April 12, 1999 || Socorro || LINEAR || — || align=right | 12 km || 
|-id=635 bgcolor=#d6d6d6
| 49635 ||  || — || April 6, 1999 || Anderson Mesa || LONEOS || EOS || align=right | 8.7 km || 
|-id=636 bgcolor=#fefefe
| 49636 ||  || — || April 16, 1999 || Socorro || LINEAR || PHO || align=right | 3.9 km || 
|-id=637 bgcolor=#E9E9E9
| 49637 ||  || — || April 16, 1999 || Socorro || LINEAR || — || align=right | 6.2 km || 
|-id=638 bgcolor=#d6d6d6
| 49638 ||  || — || April 17, 1999 || Socorro || LINEAR || — || align=right | 11 km || 
|-id=639 bgcolor=#d6d6d6
| 49639 ||  || — || May 15, 1999 || Kitt Peak || Spacewatch || — || align=right | 8.1 km || 
|-id=640 bgcolor=#d6d6d6
| 49640 ||  || — || May 10, 1999 || Socorro || LINEAR || — || align=right | 11 km || 
|-id=641 bgcolor=#d6d6d6
| 49641 ||  || — || May 10, 1999 || Socorro || LINEAR || — || align=right | 10 km || 
|-id=642 bgcolor=#d6d6d6
| 49642 ||  || — || May 10, 1999 || Socorro || LINEAR || slow || align=right | 6.1 km || 
|-id=643 bgcolor=#d6d6d6
| 49643 ||  || — || May 10, 1999 || Socorro || LINEAR || — || align=right | 5.0 km || 
|-id=644 bgcolor=#d6d6d6
| 49644 ||  || — || May 10, 1999 || Socorro || LINEAR || — || align=right | 9.5 km || 
|-id=645 bgcolor=#E9E9E9
| 49645 ||  || — || May 10, 1999 || Socorro || LINEAR || — || align=right | 5.9 km || 
|-id=646 bgcolor=#d6d6d6
| 49646 ||  || — || May 10, 1999 || Socorro || LINEAR || — || align=right | 8.4 km || 
|-id=647 bgcolor=#d6d6d6
| 49647 ||  || — || May 10, 1999 || Socorro || LINEAR || — || align=right | 15 km || 
|-id=648 bgcolor=#d6d6d6
| 49648 ||  || — || May 10, 1999 || Socorro || LINEAR || — || align=right | 9.5 km || 
|-id=649 bgcolor=#fefefe
| 49649 ||  || — || May 10, 1999 || Socorro || LINEAR || V || align=right | 2.5 km || 
|-id=650 bgcolor=#d6d6d6
| 49650 ||  || — || May 10, 1999 || Socorro || LINEAR || MEL || align=right | 17 km || 
|-id=651 bgcolor=#d6d6d6
| 49651 ||  || — || May 12, 1999 || Socorro || LINEAR || 7:4 || align=right | 15 km || 
|-id=652 bgcolor=#fefefe
| 49652 ||  || — || May 12, 1999 || Socorro || LINEAR || — || align=right | 3.2 km || 
|-id=653 bgcolor=#E9E9E9
| 49653 ||  || — || May 15, 1999 || Socorro || LINEAR || MAR || align=right | 5.5 km || 
|-id=654 bgcolor=#d6d6d6
| 49654 ||  || — || May 12, 1999 || Socorro || LINEAR || — || align=right | 10 km || 
|-id=655 bgcolor=#d6d6d6
| 49655 ||  || — || May 12, 1999 || Socorro || LINEAR || EOS || align=right | 6.1 km || 
|-id=656 bgcolor=#d6d6d6
| 49656 ||  || — || May 12, 1999 || Socorro || LINEAR || — || align=right | 9.4 km || 
|-id=657 bgcolor=#d6d6d6
| 49657 ||  || — || May 12, 1999 || Socorro || LINEAR || — || align=right | 10 km || 
|-id=658 bgcolor=#d6d6d6
| 49658 ||  || — || May 13, 1999 || Socorro || LINEAR || — || align=right | 6.5 km || 
|-id=659 bgcolor=#d6d6d6
| 49659 ||  || — || May 13, 1999 || Socorro || LINEAR || TIR || align=right | 5.9 km || 
|-id=660 bgcolor=#d6d6d6
| 49660 ||  || — || May 13, 1999 || Socorro || LINEAR || EOS || align=right | 5.7 km || 
|-id=661 bgcolor=#d6d6d6
| 49661 ||  || — || May 8, 1999 || Socorro || LINEAR || — || align=right | 14 km || 
|-id=662 bgcolor=#d6d6d6
| 49662 ||  || — || May 17, 1999 || Kitt Peak || Spacewatch || URS || align=right | 14 km || 
|-id=663 bgcolor=#d6d6d6
| 49663 ||  || — || June 8, 1999 || Socorro || LINEAR || — || align=right | 13 km || 
|-id=664 bgcolor=#FA8072
| 49664 || 1999 MV || — || June 22, 1999 || Catalina || CSS || H || align=right | 2.1 km || 
|-id=665 bgcolor=#fefefe
| 49665 ||  || — || July 12, 1999 || Socorro || LINEAR || H || align=right | 1.4 km || 
|-id=666 bgcolor=#fefefe
| 49666 ||  || — || July 13, 1999 || Socorro || LINEAR || H || align=right | 1.8 km || 
|-id=667 bgcolor=#fefefe
| 49667 ||  || — || July 22, 1999 || Socorro || LINEAR || H || align=right | 3.1 km || 
|-id=668 bgcolor=#fefefe
| 49668 ||  || — || July 22, 1999 || Socorro || LINEAR || Hfast? || align=right | 1.9 km || 
|-id=669 bgcolor=#fefefe
| 49669 ||  || — || September 8, 1999 || Socorro || LINEAR || H || align=right | 2.6 km || 
|-id=670 bgcolor=#fefefe
| 49670 ||  || — || September 10, 1999 || Socorro || LINEAR || H || align=right | 1.5 km || 
|-id=671 bgcolor=#d6d6d6
| 49671 ||  || — || September 7, 1999 || Socorro || LINEAR || EOSslow || align=right | 11 km || 
|-id=672 bgcolor=#fefefe
| 49672 ||  || — || September 8, 1999 || Socorro || LINEAR || V || align=right | 2.2 km || 
|-id=673 bgcolor=#C2E0FF
| 49673 ||  || — || September 13, 1999 || Kitt Peak || D. Davis, B. Gladman, C. Neese || other TNOcritical || align=right | 128 km || 
|-id=674 bgcolor=#fefefe
| 49674 ||  || — || September 30, 1999 || Socorro || LINEAR || H || align=right | 2.8 km || 
|-id=675 bgcolor=#fefefe
| 49675 ||  || — || September 18, 1999 || Socorro || LINEAR || H || align=right | 1.9 km || 
|-id=676 bgcolor=#fefefe
| 49676 ||  || — || October 2, 1999 || Catalina || CSS || — || align=right | 2.1 km || 
|-id=677 bgcolor=#fefefe
| 49677 ||  || — || October 4, 1999 || Prescott || P. G. Comba || — || align=right | 1.4 km || 
|-id=678 bgcolor=#fefefe
| 49678 ||  || — || October 2, 1999 || Socorro || LINEAR || H || align=right | 1.1 km || 
|-id=679 bgcolor=#fefefe
| 49679 ||  || — || October 6, 1999 || Črni Vrh || Črni Vrh || — || align=right | 2.6 km || 
|-id=680 bgcolor=#fefefe
| 49680 ||  || — || October 7, 1999 || Višnjan Observatory || K. Korlević, M. Jurić || V || align=right | 2.0 km || 
|-id=681 bgcolor=#E9E9E9
| 49681 ||  || — || October 3, 1999 || Socorro || LINEAR || — || align=right | 11 km || 
|-id=682 bgcolor=#fefefe
| 49682 ||  || — || October 4, 1999 || Socorro || LINEAR || — || align=right | 1.5 km || 
|-id=683 bgcolor=#fefefe
| 49683 ||  || — || October 9, 1999 || Kitt Peak || Spacewatch || — || align=right | 4.1 km || 
|-id=684 bgcolor=#fefefe
| 49684 ||  || — || October 6, 1999 || Socorro || LINEAR || FLO || align=right | 1.6 km || 
|-id=685 bgcolor=#fefefe
| 49685 ||  || — || October 7, 1999 || Socorro || LINEAR || — || align=right | 1.7 km || 
|-id=686 bgcolor=#fefefe
| 49686 ||  || — || October 7, 1999 || Socorro || LINEAR || — || align=right | 1.8 km || 
|-id=687 bgcolor=#fefefe
| 49687 ||  || — || October 10, 1999 || Socorro || LINEAR || — || align=right | 1.7 km || 
|-id=688 bgcolor=#fefefe
| 49688 ||  || — || October 12, 1999 || Socorro || LINEAR || — || align=right | 2.6 km || 
|-id=689 bgcolor=#fefefe
| 49689 ||  || — || October 12, 1999 || Socorro || LINEAR || FLO || align=right | 2.4 km || 
|-id=690 bgcolor=#fefefe
| 49690 ||  || — || October 15, 1999 || Socorro || LINEAR || — || align=right | 2.1 km || 
|-id=691 bgcolor=#fefefe
| 49691 ||  || — || October 3, 1999 || Catalina || CSS || FLO || align=right | 1.7 km || 
|-id=692 bgcolor=#fefefe
| 49692 ||  || — || October 29, 1999 || Kitt Peak || Spacewatch || — || align=right | 3.1 km || 
|-id=693 bgcolor=#fefefe
| 49693 ||  || — || October 31, 1999 || Socorro || LINEAR || — || align=right | 3.3 km || 
|-id=694 bgcolor=#fefefe
| 49694 ||  || — || October 18, 1999 || Anderson Mesa || LONEOS || — || align=right | 2.6 km || 
|-id=695 bgcolor=#fefefe
| 49695 ||  || — || October 20, 1999 || Anderson Mesa || LONEOS || — || align=right | 2.3 km || 
|-id=696 bgcolor=#fefefe
| 49696 ||  || — || October 28, 1999 || Catalina || CSS || — || align=right | 2.3 km || 
|-id=697 bgcolor=#fefefe
| 49697 ||  || — || October 31, 1999 || Catalina || CSS || — || align=right | 1.9 km || 
|-id=698 bgcolor=#fefefe
| 49698 Váchal || 1999 VA ||  || November 1, 1999 || Kleť || J. Tichá, M. Tichý || — || align=right | 2.2 km || 
|-id=699 bgcolor=#fefefe
| 49699 Hidetakasato || 1999 VZ ||  || November 3, 1999 || Yatsuka || H. Abe || PHO || align=right | 5.2 km || 
|-id=700 bgcolor=#fefefe
| 49700 Mather ||  ||  || November 1, 1999 || Uccle || E. W. Elst, S. I. Ipatov || — || align=right | 2.1 km || 
|}

49701–49800 

|-bgcolor=#fefefe
| 49701 ||  || — || November 5, 1999 || Oaxaca || J. M. Roe || — || align=right | 1.7 km || 
|-id=702 bgcolor=#fefefe
| 49702 Koikeda ||  ||  || November 4, 1999 || Yanagida || A. Tsuchikawa || — || align=right | 3.2 km || 
|-id=703 bgcolor=#fefefe
| 49703 ||  || — || November 11, 1999 || Fountain Hills || C. W. Juels || FLO || align=right | 2.1 km || 
|-id=704 bgcolor=#fefefe
| 49704 ||  || — || November 2, 1999 || Kitt Peak || Spacewatch || — || align=right | 1.7 km || 
|-id=705 bgcolor=#fefefe
| 49705 ||  || — || November 11, 1999 || Farpoint || G. Bell, G. Hug || V || align=right | 2.3 km || 
|-id=706 bgcolor=#fefefe
| 49706 ||  || — || November 10, 1999 || Gekko || T. Kagawa || — || align=right | 3.8 km || 
|-id=707 bgcolor=#fefefe
| 49707 ||  || — || November 13, 1999 || Uto || F. Uto || — || align=right | 3.1 km || 
|-id=708 bgcolor=#fefefe
| 49708 ||  || — || November 3, 1999 || Socorro || LINEAR || NYS || align=right | 1.9 km || 
|-id=709 bgcolor=#fefefe
| 49709 ||  || — || November 3, 1999 || Socorro || LINEAR || — || align=right | 2.1 km || 
|-id=710 bgcolor=#fefefe
| 49710 ||  || — || November 3, 1999 || Socorro || LINEAR || — || align=right | 2.5 km || 
|-id=711 bgcolor=#fefefe
| 49711 ||  || — || November 3, 1999 || Socorro || LINEAR || — || align=right | 1.9 km || 
|-id=712 bgcolor=#fefefe
| 49712 ||  || — || November 3, 1999 || Socorro || LINEAR || V || align=right | 1.6 km || 
|-id=713 bgcolor=#fefefe
| 49713 ||  || — || November 3, 1999 || Socorro || LINEAR || — || align=right | 1.6 km || 
|-id=714 bgcolor=#E9E9E9
| 49714 ||  || — || November 3, 1999 || Socorro || LINEAR || — || align=right | 6.3 km || 
|-id=715 bgcolor=#fefefe
| 49715 ||  || — || November 3, 1999 || Socorro || LINEAR || — || align=right | 2.9 km || 
|-id=716 bgcolor=#fefefe
| 49716 ||  || — || November 3, 1999 || Socorro || LINEAR || ERI || align=right | 5.2 km || 
|-id=717 bgcolor=#fefefe
| 49717 ||  || — || November 3, 1999 || Socorro || LINEAR || — || align=right | 3.2 km || 
|-id=718 bgcolor=#fefefe
| 49718 ||  || — || November 10, 1999 || Socorro || LINEAR || FLO || align=right | 1.5 km || 
|-id=719 bgcolor=#fefefe
| 49719 ||  || — || November 3, 1999 || Socorro || LINEAR || fast? || align=right | 2.6 km || 
|-id=720 bgcolor=#fefefe
| 49720 ||  || — || November 3, 1999 || Socorro || LINEAR || — || align=right | 2.5 km || 
|-id=721 bgcolor=#fefefe
| 49721 ||  || — || November 3, 1999 || Socorro || LINEAR || FLO || align=right | 3.0 km || 
|-id=722 bgcolor=#fefefe
| 49722 ||  || — || November 4, 1999 || Socorro || LINEAR || V || align=right | 2.0 km || 
|-id=723 bgcolor=#fefefe
| 49723 ||  || — || November 4, 1999 || Socorro || LINEAR || — || align=right | 4.2 km || 
|-id=724 bgcolor=#fefefe
| 49724 ||  || — || November 4, 1999 || Socorro || LINEAR || FLO || align=right | 2.0 km || 
|-id=725 bgcolor=#fefefe
| 49725 ||  || — || November 4, 1999 || Socorro || LINEAR || — || align=right | 1.7 km || 
|-id=726 bgcolor=#fefefe
| 49726 ||  || — || November 4, 1999 || Socorro || LINEAR || — || align=right | 1.3 km || 
|-id=727 bgcolor=#fefefe
| 49727 ||  || — || November 4, 1999 || Socorro || LINEAR || — || align=right | 2.0 km || 
|-id=728 bgcolor=#E9E9E9
| 49728 ||  || — || November 11, 1999 || Xinglong || SCAP || — || align=right | 5.1 km || 
|-id=729 bgcolor=#fefefe
| 49729 ||  || — || November 12, 1999 || Socorro || LINEAR || — || align=right | 1.9 km || 
|-id=730 bgcolor=#fefefe
| 49730 ||  || — || November 4, 1999 || Socorro || LINEAR || — || align=right | 1.6 km || 
|-id=731 bgcolor=#fefefe
| 49731 ||  || — || November 4, 1999 || Socorro || LINEAR || ERI || align=right | 5.1 km || 
|-id=732 bgcolor=#fefefe
| 49732 ||  || — || November 4, 1999 || Socorro || LINEAR || — || align=right | 1.5 km || 
|-id=733 bgcolor=#E9E9E9
| 49733 ||  || — || November 9, 1999 || Socorro || LINEAR || — || align=right | 3.7 km || 
|-id=734 bgcolor=#fefefe
| 49734 ||  || — || November 9, 1999 || Socorro || LINEAR || — || align=right | 1.6 km || 
|-id=735 bgcolor=#fefefe
| 49735 ||  || — || November 9, 1999 || Socorro || LINEAR || MAS || align=right | 1.9 km || 
|-id=736 bgcolor=#fefefe
| 49736 ||  || — || November 9, 1999 || Socorro || LINEAR || — || align=right | 1.9 km || 
|-id=737 bgcolor=#fefefe
| 49737 ||  || — || November 9, 1999 || Socorro || LINEAR || — || align=right | 2.8 km || 
|-id=738 bgcolor=#fefefe
| 49738 ||  || — || November 4, 1999 || Catalina || CSS || — || align=right | 1.6 km || 
|-id=739 bgcolor=#fefefe
| 49739 ||  || — || November 4, 1999 || Kitt Peak || Spacewatch || NYS || align=right | 1.6 km || 
|-id=740 bgcolor=#fefefe
| 49740 ||  || — || November 5, 1999 || Kitt Peak || Spacewatch || — || align=right | 2.1 km || 
|-id=741 bgcolor=#fefefe
| 49741 ||  || — || November 9, 1999 || Socorro || LINEAR || ERI || align=right | 3.9 km || 
|-id=742 bgcolor=#fefefe
| 49742 ||  || — || November 11, 1999 || Kitt Peak || Spacewatch || — || align=right | 2.0 km || 
|-id=743 bgcolor=#fefefe
| 49743 ||  || — || November 11, 1999 || Catalina || CSS || — || align=right | 1.5 km || 
|-id=744 bgcolor=#fefefe
| 49744 ||  || — || November 9, 1999 || Socorro || LINEAR || NYS || align=right | 1.9 km || 
|-id=745 bgcolor=#fefefe
| 49745 ||  || — || November 11, 1999 || Kitt Peak || Spacewatch || — || align=right | 1.3 km || 
|-id=746 bgcolor=#fefefe
| 49746 ||  || — || November 12, 1999 || Socorro || LINEAR || — || align=right | 2.1 km || 
|-id=747 bgcolor=#fefefe
| 49747 ||  || — || November 14, 1999 || Socorro || LINEAR || — || align=right | 4.4 km || 
|-id=748 bgcolor=#fefefe
| 49748 ||  || — || November 14, 1999 || Socorro || LINEAR || — || align=right | 1.8 km || 
|-id=749 bgcolor=#fefefe
| 49749 ||  || — || November 14, 1999 || Socorro || LINEAR || — || align=right | 2.8 km || 
|-id=750 bgcolor=#E9E9E9
| 49750 ||  || — || November 14, 1999 || Socorro || LINEAR || — || align=right | 2.3 km || 
|-id=751 bgcolor=#fefefe
| 49751 ||  || — || November 14, 1999 || Socorro || LINEAR || FLO || align=right | 1.6 km || 
|-id=752 bgcolor=#fefefe
| 49752 ||  || — || November 14, 1999 || Socorro || LINEAR || — || align=right | 1.6 km || 
|-id=753 bgcolor=#fefefe
| 49753 ||  || — || November 14, 1999 || Socorro || LINEAR || NYS || align=right | 2.2 km || 
|-id=754 bgcolor=#fefefe
| 49754 ||  || — || November 14, 1999 || Socorro || LINEAR || V || align=right | 2.0 km || 
|-id=755 bgcolor=#fefefe
| 49755 ||  || — || November 14, 1999 || Socorro || LINEAR || — || align=right | 2.2 km || 
|-id=756 bgcolor=#fefefe
| 49756 ||  || — || November 5, 1999 || Socorro || LINEAR || — || align=right | 1.6 km || 
|-id=757 bgcolor=#fefefe
| 49757 ||  || — || November 12, 1999 || Socorro || LINEAR || — || align=right | 1.9 km || 
|-id=758 bgcolor=#fefefe
| 49758 ||  || — || November 15, 1999 || Socorro || LINEAR || — || align=right | 2.6 km || 
|-id=759 bgcolor=#fefefe
| 49759 ||  || — || November 15, 1999 || Socorro || LINEAR || — || align=right | 2.1 km || 
|-id=760 bgcolor=#fefefe
| 49760 ||  || — || November 15, 1999 || Socorro || LINEAR || FLO || align=right | 1.6 km || 
|-id=761 bgcolor=#fefefe
| 49761 ||  || — || November 3, 1999 || Socorro || LINEAR || V || align=right | 2.0 km || 
|-id=762 bgcolor=#fefefe
| 49762 ||  || — || November 13, 1999 || Catalina || CSS || H || align=right | 1.4 km || 
|-id=763 bgcolor=#fefefe
| 49763 ||  || — || November 12, 1999 || Anderson Mesa || LONEOS || FLO || align=right | 1.8 km || 
|-id=764 bgcolor=#fefefe
| 49764 ||  || — || November 12, 1999 || Socorro || LINEAR || MAS || align=right | 1.6 km || 
|-id=765 bgcolor=#fefefe
| 49765 ||  || — || November 4, 1999 || Socorro || LINEAR || FLO || align=right | 1.9 km || 
|-id=766 bgcolor=#fefefe
| 49766 || 1999 WS || — || November 18, 1999 || Oohira || T. Urata || — || align=right | 2.4 km || 
|-id=767 bgcolor=#fefefe
| 49767 ||  || — || November 26, 1999 || Višnjan Observatory || K. Korlević || — || align=right | 3.2 km || 
|-id=768 bgcolor=#fefefe
| 49768 ||  || — || November 28, 1999 || Oizumi || T. Kobayashi || V || align=right | 1.5 km || 
|-id=769 bgcolor=#fefefe
| 49769 ||  || — || November 28, 1999 || Višnjan Observatory || K. Korlević || — || align=right | 2.2 km || 
|-id=770 bgcolor=#fefefe
| 49770 ||  || — || November 28, 1999 || Višnjan Observatory || K. Korlević || FLO || align=right | 2.3 km || 
|-id=771 bgcolor=#fefefe
| 49771 ||  || — || November 28, 1999 || Višnjan Observatory || K. Korlević || — || align=right | 2.3 km || 
|-id=772 bgcolor=#fefefe
| 49772 ||  || — || November 28, 1999 || Višnjan Observatory || K. Korlević || — || align=right | 2.6 km || 
|-id=773 bgcolor=#fefefe
| 49773 ||  || — || November 28, 1999 || Oizumi || T. Kobayashi || V || align=right | 2.0 km || 
|-id=774 bgcolor=#fefefe
| 49774 ||  || — || November 30, 1999 || Oizumi || T. Kobayashi || — || align=right | 2.4 km || 
|-id=775 bgcolor=#fefefe
| 49775 ||  || — || November 29, 1999 || Višnjan Observatory || K. Korlević || — || align=right | 3.6 km || 
|-id=776 bgcolor=#fefefe
| 49776 ||  || — || November 28, 1999 || Višnjan Observatory || K. Korlević || — || align=right | 2.2 km || 
|-id=777 bgcolor=#fefefe
| 49777 Cappi || 1999 XS ||  || December 2, 1999 || Prescott || P. G. Comba || — || align=right | 2.1 km || 
|-id=778 bgcolor=#fefefe
| 49778 || 1999 XT || — || December 2, 1999 || Socorro || LINEAR || — || align=right | 2.2 km || 
|-id=779 bgcolor=#fefefe
| 49779 ||  || — || December 4, 1999 || Catalina || CSS || FLO || align=right | 2.3 km || 
|-id=780 bgcolor=#fefefe
| 49780 ||  || — || December 4, 1999 || Catalina || CSS || — || align=right | 2.3 km || 
|-id=781 bgcolor=#E9E9E9
| 49781 ||  || — || December 4, 1999 || Fountain Hills || C. W. Juels || EUN || align=right | 5.2 km || 
|-id=782 bgcolor=#fefefe
| 49782 ||  || — || December 2, 1999 || Kitt Peak || Spacewatch || PHO || align=right | 3.9 km || 
|-id=783 bgcolor=#fefefe
| 49783 ||  || — || December 4, 1999 || Kitt Peak || Spacewatch || NYS || align=right | 1.6 km || 
|-id=784 bgcolor=#fefefe
| 49784 ||  || — || December 5, 1999 || Kitt Peak || Spacewatch || — || align=right | 1.7 km || 
|-id=785 bgcolor=#E9E9E9
| 49785 ||  || — || December 5, 1999 || Kitt Peak || Spacewatch || — || align=right | 1.7 km || 
|-id=786 bgcolor=#fefefe
| 49786 ||  || — || December 5, 1999 || Catalina || CSS || — || align=right | 1.9 km || 
|-id=787 bgcolor=#fefefe
| 49787 ||  || — || December 6, 1999 || Catalina || CSS || PHO || align=right | 3.1 km || 
|-id=788 bgcolor=#fefefe
| 49788 ||  || — || December 5, 1999 || Socorro || LINEAR || V || align=right | 1.6 km || 
|-id=789 bgcolor=#fefefe
| 49789 ||  || — || December 6, 1999 || Višnjan Observatory || K. Korlević || NYS || align=right | 2.9 km || 
|-id=790 bgcolor=#fefefe
| 49790 ||  || — || December 5, 1999 || Socorro || LINEAR || — || align=right | 2.6 km || 
|-id=791 bgcolor=#fefefe
| 49791 ||  || — || December 6, 1999 || Socorro || LINEAR || V || align=right | 1.5 km || 
|-id=792 bgcolor=#E9E9E9
| 49792 ||  || — || December 6, 1999 || Socorro || LINEAR || — || align=right | 5.4 km || 
|-id=793 bgcolor=#E9E9E9
| 49793 ||  || — || December 6, 1999 || Socorro || LINEAR || — || align=right | 5.3 km || 
|-id=794 bgcolor=#fefefe
| 49794 ||  || — || December 6, 1999 || Socorro || LINEAR || — || align=right | 3.3 km || 
|-id=795 bgcolor=#fefefe
| 49795 ||  || — || December 6, 1999 || Socorro || LINEAR || — || align=right | 5.9 km || 
|-id=796 bgcolor=#fefefe
| 49796 ||  || — || December 6, 1999 || Socorro || LINEAR || FLO || align=right | 1.9 km || 
|-id=797 bgcolor=#fefefe
| 49797 ||  || — || December 6, 1999 || Socorro || LINEAR || — || align=right | 2.7 km || 
|-id=798 bgcolor=#fefefe
| 49798 ||  || — || December 6, 1999 || Socorro || LINEAR || — || align=right | 2.1 km || 
|-id=799 bgcolor=#fefefe
| 49799 ||  || — || December 6, 1999 || Socorro || LINEAR || FLO || align=right | 1.9 km || 
|-id=800 bgcolor=#fefefe
| 49800 ||  || — || December 6, 1999 || Socorro || LINEAR || NYS || align=right | 4.1 km || 
|}

49801–49900 

|-bgcolor=#E9E9E9
| 49801 ||  || — || December 6, 1999 || Socorro || LINEAR || — || align=right | 6.7 km || 
|-id=802 bgcolor=#E9E9E9
| 49802 ||  || — || December 6, 1999 || Socorro || LINEAR || — || align=right | 3.3 km || 
|-id=803 bgcolor=#fefefe
| 49803 ||  || — || December 7, 1999 || Socorro || LINEAR || — || align=right | 1.6 km || 
|-id=804 bgcolor=#fefefe
| 49804 ||  || — || December 4, 1999 || Catalina || CSS || — || align=right | 2.1 km || 
|-id=805 bgcolor=#fefefe
| 49805 ||  || — || December 6, 1999 || Oizumi || T. Kobayashi || — || align=right | 5.4 km || 
|-id=806 bgcolor=#E9E9E9
| 49806 ||  || — || December 8, 1999 || Socorro || LINEAR || — || align=right | 2.3 km || 
|-id=807 bgcolor=#fefefe
| 49807 ||  || — || December 6, 1999 || Socorro || LINEAR || — || align=right | 2.3 km || 
|-id=808 bgcolor=#fefefe
| 49808 ||  || — || December 6, 1999 || Socorro || LINEAR || — || align=right | 4.3 km || 
|-id=809 bgcolor=#fefefe
| 49809 ||  || — || December 7, 1999 || Socorro || LINEAR || — || align=right | 2.2 km || 
|-id=810 bgcolor=#fefefe
| 49810 ||  || — || December 7, 1999 || Socorro || LINEAR || FLO || align=right | 2.1 km || 
|-id=811 bgcolor=#fefefe
| 49811 ||  || — || December 7, 1999 || Socorro || LINEAR || NYS || align=right | 2.0 km || 
|-id=812 bgcolor=#fefefe
| 49812 ||  || — || December 7, 1999 || Socorro || LINEAR || — || align=right | 1.7 km || 
|-id=813 bgcolor=#fefefe
| 49813 ||  || — || December 7, 1999 || Socorro || LINEAR || — || align=right | 1.8 km || 
|-id=814 bgcolor=#fefefe
| 49814 ||  || — || December 7, 1999 || Socorro || LINEAR || V || align=right | 2.3 km || 
|-id=815 bgcolor=#fefefe
| 49815 ||  || — || December 7, 1999 || Socorro || LINEAR || — || align=right | 2.1 km || 
|-id=816 bgcolor=#fefefe
| 49816 ||  || — || December 7, 1999 || Socorro || LINEAR || FLO || align=right | 2.5 km || 
|-id=817 bgcolor=#fefefe
| 49817 ||  || — || December 7, 1999 || Socorro || LINEAR || FLO || align=right | 1.8 km || 
|-id=818 bgcolor=#fefefe
| 49818 ||  || — || December 7, 1999 || Socorro || LINEAR || NYS || align=right | 1.8 km || 
|-id=819 bgcolor=#fefefe
| 49819 ||  || — || December 7, 1999 || Socorro || LINEAR || — || align=right | 1.8 km || 
|-id=820 bgcolor=#fefefe
| 49820 ||  || — || December 7, 1999 || Socorro || LINEAR || FLO || align=right | 2.6 km || 
|-id=821 bgcolor=#fefefe
| 49821 ||  || — || December 7, 1999 || Socorro || LINEAR || — || align=right | 1.6 km || 
|-id=822 bgcolor=#fefefe
| 49822 ||  || — || December 7, 1999 || Socorro || LINEAR || — || align=right | 2.4 km || 
|-id=823 bgcolor=#fefefe
| 49823 ||  || — || December 7, 1999 || Socorro || LINEAR || NYS || align=right | 2.0 km || 
|-id=824 bgcolor=#fefefe
| 49824 ||  || — || December 7, 1999 || Socorro || LINEAR || — || align=right | 2.8 km || 
|-id=825 bgcolor=#fefefe
| 49825 ||  || — || December 7, 1999 || Socorro || LINEAR || FLO || align=right | 1.9 km || 
|-id=826 bgcolor=#fefefe
| 49826 ||  || — || December 7, 1999 || Socorro || LINEAR || — || align=right | 2.5 km || 
|-id=827 bgcolor=#fefefe
| 49827 ||  || — || December 7, 1999 || Socorro || LINEAR || — || align=right | 2.6 km || 
|-id=828 bgcolor=#fefefe
| 49828 ||  || — || December 7, 1999 || Socorro || LINEAR || — || align=right | 1.2 km || 
|-id=829 bgcolor=#fefefe
| 49829 ||  || — || December 7, 1999 || Socorro || LINEAR || — || align=right | 2.7 km || 
|-id=830 bgcolor=#fefefe
| 49830 ||  || — || December 7, 1999 || Socorro || LINEAR || NYS || align=right | 2.1 km || 
|-id=831 bgcolor=#fefefe
| 49831 ||  || — || December 7, 1999 || Socorro || LINEAR || NYS || align=right | 1.7 km || 
|-id=832 bgcolor=#fefefe
| 49832 ||  || — || December 7, 1999 || Socorro || LINEAR || — || align=right | 3.2 km || 
|-id=833 bgcolor=#fefefe
| 49833 ||  || — || December 7, 1999 || Socorro || LINEAR || NYS || align=right | 4.3 km || 
|-id=834 bgcolor=#fefefe
| 49834 ||  || — || December 7, 1999 || Socorro || LINEAR || — || align=right | 2.9 km || 
|-id=835 bgcolor=#fefefe
| 49835 ||  || — || December 7, 1999 || Socorro || LINEAR || V || align=right | 2.0 km || 
|-id=836 bgcolor=#fefefe
| 49836 ||  || — || December 7, 1999 || Socorro || LINEAR || NYS || align=right | 2.1 km || 
|-id=837 bgcolor=#fefefe
| 49837 ||  || — || December 7, 1999 || Socorro || LINEAR || — || align=right | 2.9 km || 
|-id=838 bgcolor=#fefefe
| 49838 ||  || — || December 7, 1999 || Socorro || LINEAR || NYS || align=right | 5.3 km || 
|-id=839 bgcolor=#fefefe
| 49839 ||  || — || December 7, 1999 || Socorro || LINEAR || — || align=right | 3.4 km || 
|-id=840 bgcolor=#fefefe
| 49840 ||  || — || December 7, 1999 || Socorro || LINEAR || — || align=right | 2.4 km || 
|-id=841 bgcolor=#fefefe
| 49841 ||  || — || December 7, 1999 || Socorro || LINEAR || — || align=right | 2.1 km || 
|-id=842 bgcolor=#fefefe
| 49842 ||  || — || December 7, 1999 || Socorro || LINEAR || — || align=right | 3.4 km || 
|-id=843 bgcolor=#fefefe
| 49843 ||  || — || December 7, 1999 || Socorro || LINEAR || — || align=right | 1.7 km || 
|-id=844 bgcolor=#fefefe
| 49844 ||  || — || December 7, 1999 || Socorro || LINEAR || — || align=right | 1.7 km || 
|-id=845 bgcolor=#fefefe
| 49845 ||  || — || December 7, 1999 || Socorro || LINEAR || — || align=right | 2.0 km || 
|-id=846 bgcolor=#E9E9E9
| 49846 ||  || — || December 7, 1999 || Socorro || LINEAR || — || align=right | 3.3 km || 
|-id=847 bgcolor=#fefefe
| 49847 ||  || — || December 7, 1999 || Socorro || LINEAR || FLO || align=right | 2.7 km || 
|-id=848 bgcolor=#fefefe
| 49848 ||  || — || December 7, 1999 || Socorro || LINEAR || V || align=right | 2.6 km || 
|-id=849 bgcolor=#fefefe
| 49849 ||  || — || December 7, 1999 || Socorro || LINEAR || — || align=right | 10 km || 
|-id=850 bgcolor=#fefefe
| 49850 ||  || — || December 7, 1999 || Socorro || LINEAR || — || align=right | 2.5 km || 
|-id=851 bgcolor=#fefefe
| 49851 ||  || — || December 7, 1999 || Oizumi || T. Kobayashi || — || align=right | 2.9 km || 
|-id=852 bgcolor=#fefefe
| 49852 ||  || — || December 9, 1999 || Oizumi || T. Kobayashi || — || align=right | 2.2 km || 
|-id=853 bgcolor=#fefefe
| 49853 ||  || — || December 7, 1999 || Socorro || LINEAR || V || align=right | 2.5 km || 
|-id=854 bgcolor=#fefefe
| 49854 ||  || — || December 7, 1999 || Socorro || LINEAR || — || align=right | 2.8 km || 
|-id=855 bgcolor=#fefefe
| 49855 ||  || — || December 7, 1999 || Socorro || LINEAR || — || align=right | 2.8 km || 
|-id=856 bgcolor=#fefefe
| 49856 ||  || — || December 7, 1999 || Socorro || LINEAR || — || align=right | 4.0 km || 
|-id=857 bgcolor=#fefefe
| 49857 ||  || — || December 7, 1999 || Socorro || LINEAR || — || align=right | 3.1 km || 
|-id=858 bgcolor=#fefefe
| 49858 ||  || — || December 7, 1999 || Socorro || LINEAR || — || align=right | 4.3 km || 
|-id=859 bgcolor=#fefefe
| 49859 ||  || — || December 7, 1999 || Socorro || LINEAR || ERI || align=right | 6.6 km || 
|-id=860 bgcolor=#E9E9E9
| 49860 ||  || — || December 7, 1999 || Socorro || LINEAR || RAF || align=right | 2.4 km || 
|-id=861 bgcolor=#fefefe
| 49861 ||  || — || December 7, 1999 || Socorro || LINEAR || — || align=right | 2.2 km || 
|-id=862 bgcolor=#fefefe
| 49862 ||  || — || December 9, 1999 || Gekko || T. Kagawa || — || align=right | 2.1 km || 
|-id=863 bgcolor=#fefefe
| 49863 ||  || — || December 7, 1999 || Socorro || LINEAR || — || align=right | 4.2 km || 
|-id=864 bgcolor=#fefefe
| 49864 ||  || — || December 10, 1999 || Oizumi || T. Kobayashi || FLO || align=right | 3.2 km || 
|-id=865 bgcolor=#fefefe
| 49865 ||  || — || December 4, 1999 || Catalina || CSS || NYS || align=right | 1.6 km || 
|-id=866 bgcolor=#E9E9E9
| 49866 ||  || — || December 7, 1999 || Catalina || CSS || EUN || align=right | 4.5 km || 
|-id=867 bgcolor=#fefefe
| 49867 ||  || — || December 8, 1999 || Catalina || CSS || — || align=right | 2.7 km || 
|-id=868 bgcolor=#fefefe
| 49868 ||  || — || December 7, 1999 || Socorro || LINEAR || — || align=right | 2.0 km || 
|-id=869 bgcolor=#fefefe
| 49869 ||  || — || December 12, 1999 || Calgary || G. W. Billings || — || align=right | 2.1 km || 
|-id=870 bgcolor=#fefefe
| 49870 ||  || — || December 5, 1999 || Catalina || CSS || NYS || align=right | 2.5 km || 
|-id=871 bgcolor=#fefefe
| 49871 ||  || — || December 5, 1999 || Catalina || CSS || FLO || align=right | 3.5 km || 
|-id=872 bgcolor=#fefefe
| 49872 ||  || — || December 7, 1999 || Catalina || CSS || — || align=right | 1.7 km || 
|-id=873 bgcolor=#fefefe
| 49873 ||  || — || December 7, 1999 || Catalina || CSS || V || align=right | 2.1 km || 
|-id=874 bgcolor=#fefefe
| 49874 ||  || — || December 12, 1999 || Socorro || LINEAR || FLO || align=right | 2.5 km || 
|-id=875 bgcolor=#fefefe
| 49875 ||  || — || December 12, 1999 || Socorro || LINEAR || V || align=right | 1.5 km || 
|-id=876 bgcolor=#fefefe
| 49876 ||  || — || December 12, 1999 || Socorro || LINEAR || — || align=right | 4.9 km || 
|-id=877 bgcolor=#fefefe
| 49877 ||  || — || December 12, 1999 || Socorro || LINEAR || — || align=right | 3.8 km || 
|-id=878 bgcolor=#fefefe
| 49878 ||  || — || December 12, 1999 || Socorro || LINEAR || — || align=right | 3.0 km || 
|-id=879 bgcolor=#fefefe
| 49879 ||  || — || December 6, 1999 || Socorro || LINEAR || — || align=right | 2.4 km || 
|-id=880 bgcolor=#fefefe
| 49880 ||  || — || December 8, 1999 || Socorro || LINEAR || — || align=right | 2.2 km || 
|-id=881 bgcolor=#fefefe
| 49881 ||  || — || December 4, 1999 || Kitt Peak || Spacewatch || EUT || align=right | 1.6 km || 
|-id=882 bgcolor=#E9E9E9
| 49882 ||  || — || December 2, 1999 || Kitt Peak || Spacewatch || — || align=right | 3.6 km || 
|-id=883 bgcolor=#E9E9E9
| 49883 ||  || — || December 2, 1999 || Kitt Peak || Spacewatch || — || align=right | 2.2 km || 
|-id=884 bgcolor=#fefefe
| 49884 ||  || — || December 10, 1999 || Socorro || LINEAR || V || align=right | 2.1 km || 
|-id=885 bgcolor=#fefefe
| 49885 ||  || — || December 7, 1999 || Kitt Peak || Spacewatch || FLO || align=right | 1.5 km || 
|-id=886 bgcolor=#fefefe
| 49886 ||  || — || December 7, 1999 || Kitt Peak || Spacewatch || NYS || align=right | 3.3 km || 
|-id=887 bgcolor=#fefefe
| 49887 ||  || — || December 8, 1999 || Socorro || LINEAR || NYS || align=right | 1.8 km || 
|-id=888 bgcolor=#fefefe
| 49888 ||  || — || December 8, 1999 || Socorro || LINEAR || V || align=right | 1.7 km || 
|-id=889 bgcolor=#fefefe
| 49889 ||  || — || December 8, 1999 || Socorro || LINEAR || — || align=right | 4.9 km || 
|-id=890 bgcolor=#fefefe
| 49890 ||  || — || December 8, 1999 || Socorro || LINEAR || — || align=right | 2.6 km || 
|-id=891 bgcolor=#fefefe
| 49891 ||  || — || December 8, 1999 || Socorro || LINEAR || FLO || align=right | 2.8 km || 
|-id=892 bgcolor=#fefefe
| 49892 ||  || — || December 8, 1999 || Socorro || LINEAR || — || align=right | 2.0 km || 
|-id=893 bgcolor=#fefefe
| 49893 ||  || — || December 8, 1999 || Socorro || LINEAR || FLO || align=right | 2.9 km || 
|-id=894 bgcolor=#fefefe
| 49894 ||  || — || December 8, 1999 || Socorro || LINEAR || FLO || align=right | 2.7 km || 
|-id=895 bgcolor=#fefefe
| 49895 ||  || — || December 8, 1999 || Socorro || LINEAR || V || align=right | 1.6 km || 
|-id=896 bgcolor=#E9E9E9
| 49896 ||  || — || December 8, 1999 || Socorro || LINEAR || — || align=right | 2.7 km || 
|-id=897 bgcolor=#fefefe
| 49897 ||  || — || December 8, 1999 || Socorro || LINEAR || — || align=right | 2.5 km || 
|-id=898 bgcolor=#fefefe
| 49898 ||  || — || December 8, 1999 || Socorro || LINEAR || — || align=right | 4.6 km || 
|-id=899 bgcolor=#fefefe
| 49899 ||  || — || December 8, 1999 || Kitt Peak || Spacewatch || — || align=right | 2.1 km || 
|-id=900 bgcolor=#E9E9E9
| 49900 ||  || — || December 8, 1999 || Catalina || CSS || — || align=right | 6.1 km || 
|}

49901–50000 

|-bgcolor=#fefefe
| 49901 ||  || — || December 8, 1999 || Socorro || LINEAR || — || align=right | 2.3 km || 
|-id=902 bgcolor=#E9E9E9
| 49902 ||  || — || December 8, 1999 || Socorro || LINEAR || GEF || align=right | 3.0 km || 
|-id=903 bgcolor=#E9E9E9
| 49903 ||  || — || December 8, 1999 || Socorro || LINEAR || — || align=right | 2.8 km || 
|-id=904 bgcolor=#fefefe
| 49904 ||  || — || December 8, 1999 || Socorro || LINEAR || — || align=right | 5.2 km || 
|-id=905 bgcolor=#fefefe
| 49905 ||  || — || December 8, 1999 || Socorro || LINEAR || — || align=right | 2.1 km || 
|-id=906 bgcolor=#E9E9E9
| 49906 ||  || — || December 8, 1999 || Socorro || LINEAR || — || align=right | 3.0 km || 
|-id=907 bgcolor=#fefefe
| 49907 ||  || — || December 9, 1999 || Socorro || LINEAR || V || align=right | 3.7 km || 
|-id=908 bgcolor=#fefefe
| 49908 ||  || — || December 10, 1999 || Socorro || LINEAR || — || align=right | 3.6 km || 
|-id=909 bgcolor=#fefefe
| 49909 ||  || — || December 10, 1999 || Socorro || LINEAR || — || align=right | 4.1 km || 
|-id=910 bgcolor=#fefefe
| 49910 ||  || — || December 10, 1999 || Socorro || LINEAR || — || align=right | 2.8 km || 
|-id=911 bgcolor=#fefefe
| 49911 ||  || — || December 10, 1999 || Socorro || LINEAR || — || align=right | 4.4 km || 
|-id=912 bgcolor=#fefefe
| 49912 ||  || — || December 10, 1999 || Socorro || LINEAR || FLO || align=right | 2.4 km || 
|-id=913 bgcolor=#fefefe
| 49913 ||  || — || December 10, 1999 || Socorro || LINEAR || FLO || align=right | 2.0 km || 
|-id=914 bgcolor=#fefefe
| 49914 ||  || — || December 10, 1999 || Socorro || LINEAR || NYS || align=right | 1.3 km || 
|-id=915 bgcolor=#fefefe
| 49915 ||  || — || December 10, 1999 || Socorro || LINEAR || — || align=right | 2.9 km || 
|-id=916 bgcolor=#E9E9E9
| 49916 ||  || — || December 10, 1999 || Socorro || LINEAR || — || align=right | 6.0 km || 
|-id=917 bgcolor=#fefefe
| 49917 ||  || — || December 10, 1999 || Socorro || LINEAR || — || align=right | 2.3 km || 
|-id=918 bgcolor=#E9E9E9
| 49918 ||  || — || December 10, 1999 || Socorro || LINEAR || — || align=right | 2.9 km || 
|-id=919 bgcolor=#fefefe
| 49919 ||  || — || December 10, 1999 || Socorro || LINEAR || — || align=right | 2.7 km || 
|-id=920 bgcolor=#fefefe
| 49920 ||  || — || December 10, 1999 || Socorro || LINEAR || — || align=right | 3.6 km || 
|-id=921 bgcolor=#fefefe
| 49921 ||  || — || December 10, 1999 || Socorro || LINEAR || NYS || align=right | 5.4 km || 
|-id=922 bgcolor=#fefefe
| 49922 ||  || — || December 10, 1999 || Socorro || LINEAR || — || align=right | 2.5 km || 
|-id=923 bgcolor=#E9E9E9
| 49923 ||  || — || December 10, 1999 || Socorro || LINEAR || MAR || align=right | 5.3 km || 
|-id=924 bgcolor=#fefefe
| 49924 ||  || — || December 10, 1999 || Socorro || LINEAR || FLO || align=right | 3.5 km || 
|-id=925 bgcolor=#fefefe
| 49925 ||  || — || December 10, 1999 || Socorro || LINEAR || — || align=right | 2.7 km || 
|-id=926 bgcolor=#fefefe
| 49926 ||  || — || December 10, 1999 || Socorro || LINEAR || — || align=right | 2.3 km || 
|-id=927 bgcolor=#fefefe
| 49927 ||  || — || December 10, 1999 || Socorro || LINEAR || — || align=right | 3.7 km || 
|-id=928 bgcolor=#E9E9E9
| 49928 ||  || — || December 10, 1999 || Socorro || LINEAR || — || align=right | 3.7 km || 
|-id=929 bgcolor=#fefefe
| 49929 ||  || — || December 10, 1999 || Socorro || LINEAR || FLO || align=right | 2.9 km || 
|-id=930 bgcolor=#E9E9E9
| 49930 ||  || — || December 10, 1999 || Socorro || LINEAR || ADE || align=right | 11 km || 
|-id=931 bgcolor=#fefefe
| 49931 ||  || — || December 10, 1999 || Socorro || LINEAR || — || align=right | 2.4 km || 
|-id=932 bgcolor=#fefefe
| 49932 ||  || — || December 10, 1999 || Socorro || LINEAR || — || align=right | 2.2 km || 
|-id=933 bgcolor=#fefefe
| 49933 ||  || — || December 10, 1999 || Socorro || LINEAR || — || align=right | 2.4 km || 
|-id=934 bgcolor=#fefefe
| 49934 ||  || — || December 10, 1999 || Socorro || LINEAR || FLO || align=right | 1.8 km || 
|-id=935 bgcolor=#fefefe
| 49935 ||  || — || December 10, 1999 || Socorro || LINEAR || — || align=right | 3.3 km || 
|-id=936 bgcolor=#fefefe
| 49936 ||  || — || December 10, 1999 || Socorro || LINEAR || — || align=right | 3.4 km || 
|-id=937 bgcolor=#fefefe
| 49937 ||  || — || December 10, 1999 || Socorro || LINEAR || — || align=right | 3.4 km || 
|-id=938 bgcolor=#E9E9E9
| 49938 ||  || — || December 10, 1999 || Socorro || LINEAR || ADE || align=right | 11 km || 
|-id=939 bgcolor=#fefefe
| 49939 ||  || — || December 10, 1999 || Socorro || LINEAR || — || align=right | 2.7 km || 
|-id=940 bgcolor=#E9E9E9
| 49940 ||  || — || December 12, 1999 || Socorro || LINEAR || — || align=right | 2.5 km || 
|-id=941 bgcolor=#fefefe
| 49941 ||  || — || December 12, 1999 || Socorro || LINEAR || — || align=right | 1.9 km || 
|-id=942 bgcolor=#fefefe
| 49942 ||  || — || December 12, 1999 || Socorro || LINEAR || FLO || align=right | 2.4 km || 
|-id=943 bgcolor=#fefefe
| 49943 ||  || — || December 12, 1999 || Socorro || LINEAR || — || align=right | 2.7 km || 
|-id=944 bgcolor=#fefefe
| 49944 ||  || — || December 12, 1999 || Socorro || LINEAR || FLO || align=right | 2.5 km || 
|-id=945 bgcolor=#fefefe
| 49945 ||  || — || December 12, 1999 || Socorro || LINEAR || V || align=right | 1.0 km || 
|-id=946 bgcolor=#fefefe
| 49946 ||  || — || December 12, 1999 || Socorro || LINEAR || V || align=right | 2.3 km || 
|-id=947 bgcolor=#E9E9E9
| 49947 ||  || — || December 12, 1999 || Socorro || LINEAR || ADE || align=right | 8.7 km || 
|-id=948 bgcolor=#fefefe
| 49948 ||  || — || December 12, 1999 || Socorro || LINEAR || V || align=right | 2.3 km || 
|-id=949 bgcolor=#fefefe
| 49949 ||  || — || December 12, 1999 || Socorro || LINEAR || — || align=right | 2.4 km || 
|-id=950 bgcolor=#fefefe
| 49950 ||  || — || December 12, 1999 || Socorro || LINEAR || V || align=right | 2.2 km || 
|-id=951 bgcolor=#fefefe
| 49951 ||  || — || December 13, 1999 || Socorro || LINEAR || V || align=right | 1.8 km || 
|-id=952 bgcolor=#FA8072
| 49952 ||  || — || December 14, 1999 || Socorro || LINEAR || — || align=right | 2.1 km || 
|-id=953 bgcolor=#fefefe
| 49953 ||  || — || December 14, 1999 || Socorro || LINEAR || FLO || align=right | 3.9 km || 
|-id=954 bgcolor=#fefefe
| 49954 ||  || — || December 13, 1999 || Kitt Peak || Spacewatch || NYS || align=right | 5.0 km || 
|-id=955 bgcolor=#fefefe
| 49955 ||  || — || December 13, 1999 || Kitt Peak || Spacewatch || FLO || align=right | 2.0 km || 
|-id=956 bgcolor=#fefefe
| 49956 ||  || — || December 14, 1999 || Socorro || LINEAR || — || align=right | 5.3 km || 
|-id=957 bgcolor=#E9E9E9
| 49957 ||  || — || December 15, 1999 || Socorro || LINEAR || — || align=right | 3.2 km || 
|-id=958 bgcolor=#fefefe
| 49958 ||  || — || December 15, 1999 || Socorro || LINEAR || — || align=right | 3.0 km || 
|-id=959 bgcolor=#fefefe
| 49959 ||  || — || December 13, 1999 || Kitt Peak || Spacewatch || FLO || align=right | 2.2 km || 
|-id=960 bgcolor=#fefefe
| 49960 ||  || — || December 13, 1999 || Kitt Peak || Spacewatch || — || align=right | 2.1 km || 
|-id=961 bgcolor=#fefefe
| 49961 ||  || — || December 15, 1999 || Kitt Peak || Spacewatch || — || align=right | 1.7 km || 
|-id=962 bgcolor=#fefefe
| 49962 ||  || — || December 15, 1999 || Kitt Peak || Spacewatch || — || align=right | 2.8 km || 
|-id=963 bgcolor=#fefefe
| 49963 ||  || — || December 14, 1999 || Kitt Peak || Spacewatch || — || align=right | 2.2 km || 
|-id=964 bgcolor=#fefefe
| 49964 ||  || — || December 14, 1999 || Kitt Peak || Spacewatch || MAS || align=right | 2.4 km || 
|-id=965 bgcolor=#E9E9E9
| 49965 ||  || — || December 7, 1999 || Catalina || CSS || EUN || align=right | 7.0 km || 
|-id=966 bgcolor=#fefefe
| 49966 ||  || — || December 8, 1999 || Socorro || LINEAR || — || align=right | 6.3 km || 
|-id=967 bgcolor=#fefefe
| 49967 ||  || — || December 3, 1999 || Anderson Mesa || LONEOS || FLO || align=right | 1.8 km || 
|-id=968 bgcolor=#fefefe
| 49968 ||  || — || December 3, 1999 || Anderson Mesa || LONEOS || — || align=right | 3.3 km || 
|-id=969 bgcolor=#fefefe
| 49969 ||  || — || December 6, 1999 || Socorro || LINEAR || — || align=right | 2.2 km || 
|-id=970 bgcolor=#fefefe
| 49970 ||  || — || December 6, 1999 || Socorro || LINEAR || — || align=right | 1.9 km || 
|-id=971 bgcolor=#fefefe
| 49971 ||  || — || December 6, 1999 || Socorro || LINEAR || V || align=right | 1.6 km || 
|-id=972 bgcolor=#E9E9E9
| 49972 ||  || — || December 12, 1999 || Kitt Peak || Spacewatch || — || align=right | 2.1 km || 
|-id=973 bgcolor=#fefefe
| 49973 || 1999 YQ || — || December 16, 1999 || Socorro || LINEAR || PHO || align=right | 3.4 km || 
|-id=974 bgcolor=#fefefe
| 49974 ||  || — || December 16, 1999 || Kitt Peak || Spacewatch || NYS || align=right | 2.7 km || 
|-id=975 bgcolor=#fefefe
| 49975 ||  || — || December 16, 1999 || Socorro || LINEAR || — || align=right | 2.7 km || 
|-id=976 bgcolor=#fefefe
| 49976 ||  || — || December 28, 1999 || Farpoint || G. Hug, G. Bell || — || align=right | 2.4 km || 
|-id=977 bgcolor=#fefefe
| 49977 ||  || — || December 28, 1999 || Farpoint || G. Hug, G. Bell || — || align=right | 2.2 km || 
|-id=978 bgcolor=#fefefe
| 49978 ||  || — || December 28, 1999 || Socorro || LINEAR || PHO || align=right | 3.8 km || 
|-id=979 bgcolor=#fefefe
| 49979 ||  || — || December 27, 1999 || Kitt Peak || Spacewatch || NYS || align=right | 2.6 km || 
|-id=980 bgcolor=#fefefe
| 49980 ||  || — || December 27, 1999 || Kitt Peak || Spacewatch || FLO || align=right | 1.4 km || 
|-id=981 bgcolor=#fefefe
| 49981 ||  || — || December 30, 1999 || Višnjan Observatory || K. Korlević || — || align=right | 2.9 km || 
|-id=982 bgcolor=#fefefe
| 49982 ||  || — || December 31, 1999 || Anderson Mesa || LONEOS || — || align=right | 4.3 km || 
|-id=983 bgcolor=#fefefe
| 49983 ||  || — || December 31, 1999 || Anderson Mesa || LONEOS || NYS || align=right | 1.7 km || 
|-id=984 bgcolor=#fefefe
| 49984 ||  || — || January 2, 2000 || Kitt Peak || Spacewatch || V || align=right | 2.0 km || 
|-id=985 bgcolor=#fefefe
| 49985 ||  || — || January 2, 2000 || Višnjan Observatory || K. Korlević || FLO || align=right | 1.9 km || 
|-id=986 bgcolor=#fefefe
| 49986 ||  || — || January 3, 2000 || Oizumi || T. Kobayashi || — || align=right | 2.3 km || 
|-id=987 bgcolor=#E9E9E9
| 49987 Bonata ||  ||  || January 3, 2000 || San Marcello || L. Tesi, G. Forti || — || align=right | 3.3 km || 
|-id=988 bgcolor=#fefefe
| 49988 ||  || — || January 3, 2000 || Gekko || T. Kagawa || — || align=right | 2.0 km || 
|-id=989 bgcolor=#fefefe
| 49989 ||  || — || January 2, 2000 || Višnjan Observatory || K. Korlević || — || align=right | 1.8 km || 
|-id=990 bgcolor=#fefefe
| 49990 ||  || — || January 4, 2000 || Višnjan Observatory || K. Korlević || — || align=right | 2.8 km || 
|-id=991 bgcolor=#E9E9E9
| 49991 ||  || — || January 4, 2000 || Kitt Peak || Spacewatch || — || align=right | 2.0 km || 
|-id=992 bgcolor=#E9E9E9
| 49992 ||  || — || January 2, 2000 || Socorro || LINEAR || — || align=right | 2.7 km || 
|-id=993 bgcolor=#fefefe
| 49993 ||  || — || January 2, 2000 || Socorro || LINEAR || — || align=right | 2.7 km || 
|-id=994 bgcolor=#fefefe
| 49994 ||  || — || January 2, 2000 || Socorro || LINEAR || FLO || align=right | 3.0 km || 
|-id=995 bgcolor=#fefefe
| 49995 ||  || — || January 3, 2000 || Socorro || LINEAR || — || align=right | 2.0 km || 
|-id=996 bgcolor=#fefefe
| 49996 ||  || — || January 3, 2000 || Socorro || LINEAR || NYS || align=right | 3.7 km || 
|-id=997 bgcolor=#fefefe
| 49997 ||  || — || January 3, 2000 || Socorro || LINEAR || — || align=right | 6.1 km || 
|-id=998 bgcolor=#fefefe
| 49998 ||  || — || January 3, 2000 || Socorro || LINEAR || — || align=right | 2.2 km || 
|-id=999 bgcolor=#fefefe
| 49999 ||  || — || January 3, 2000 || Socorro || LINEAR || — || align=right | 4.0 km || 
|-id=000 bgcolor=#C2E0FF
| 50000 Quaoar ||  ||  || June 4, 2002 || Palomar || C. Trujillo, M. E. Brown || cubewano (hot)moon || align=right | 1400 km || 
|}

References

External links 
 Discovery Circumstances: Numbered Minor Planets (45001)–(50000) (IAU Minor Planet Center)

0049